= Bolt Head to Bolt Tail =

Protected area in Devon, England

Coordinates: 50.225°N 3.828°W

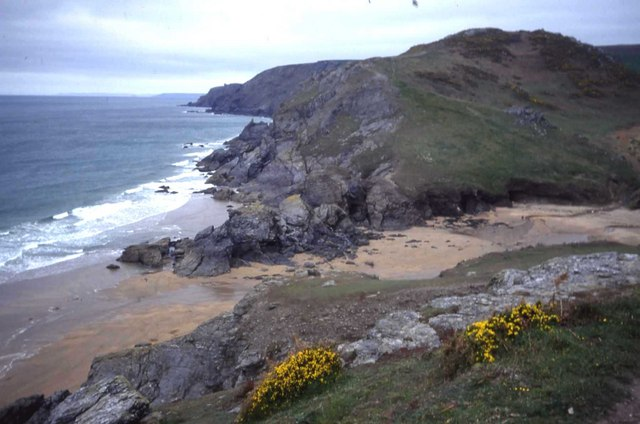
Soar Mill Cove

Bolt Head to Bolt Tail is a Site of Special Scientific Interest (SSSI) along a section of the southern coastline of Devon, England that is within the South Devon National Landscape. This protected area is located between Hope Cove and the Kingsbridge Estuary and includes headlands called Bolt Head and Bolt Tail as well as Bolberry Down and landforms such as Greystone Ledge and Soar Mill Cove. The South West Coast Path traverses this protected area. This area is protected because of the plant, lichen, invertebrate and bird diversity present here.

This protected area previously had the name Bolt Head SSSI and is adjacent to the Site of Special Scientific Interest called Salcombe to Kingsbridge Estuary, and so forms part of a wider area of nature protection.

== Biology ==
Plants in the coastal grasslands include buckshorn plantain, sea plantain, wild carrot, bluebell and bloody cranesbill. There are also heathland habitats where plant species include heather, bell heather, western gorse, carrot broomrape, upright chickweed, autumn squill, portland spurge and sea storksbill. Long-headed clover (Trifolium incarnatum subspecies molinerii) has been recorded near Soar Mill Cove.

Lichen species occurring on rock surfaces include Cladonia convoluta and Cladonia forma (genus Cladonia), Teloschistes flavicans, Roccella fuciformis, Roccella phycopsis and Buellia leptoclinoides (genus Buellia).

The invertebrates found in this protected area include the grey bush cricket, some cockroach species (Ectobius pallidus and Ectobius panzeri) and some ant species (Solenopsis fugax, Strongylongnathus testaceus and Anergates atratulus). The beetle species Meloe rugosus (genus Meloe) has recently been recorded at Bolberry Down.

Woodland is present between Bolt Head and Kingsbridge Estuary, where tree species include sessile oak, ash, beech and sycamore.

Bird species recorded in this protected area include cirl bunting, fulmar and shag.

== Geology ==
The cliffs are composed of schists from the Devonian period.

== Land ownership ==
Most of the land within Bolt Head to Bolt Tail SSSI is owned by the National Trust (the National Trust refer to this land as Bolberry Down). Some areas within this Site of Special Scientific Interest are part of the Crown Estate.
