= List of shipwrecks in January 1887 =

The list of shipwrecks in January 1887 includes ships sunk, foundered, grounded, or otherwise lost during January 1887.

== 1 January ==
List of shipwrecks: 1 January 1887
Ship	State	Description
Tell Tale	United Kingdom	The schooner was wrecked. Her crew survived. She was on a voyage from Penzance, Cornwall to Porthcawl, Glamorgan.

== 2 January ==
List of shipwrecks: 2 January 1887
Ship	State	Description
Duke of Connaught	United Kingdom	The full-rigged ship was run into by the steamship Dragoman (United Kingdom) and sank off Bardsey Island, Pembrokeshire with the loss of fourteen of her eighteen crew. Survivors were rescued by Dragoman. Duke of Connaught was on a voyage from London to Maryport, Cumberland.
Londesborough	United Kingdom	The ship was driven ashore in Robin Hoods Bay.

== 3 January ==
List of shipwrecks: 3 January 1887
Ship	State	Description
Connaught	United Kingdom	The steamship was driven ashore at "Galita". Her crew survived. She was on a voyage from Palermo, Sicily, Italy to New York City, United States.
Martha	United Kingdom	The schooner was run into by the steamship Glanwern (United Kingdom) and sank in the River Thames downstream of Gravesend, Kent.

== 4 January ==
List of shipwrecks: 4 January 1887
Ship	State	Description
Alfonso	United Kingdom	The steamship ran aground on the Knott Spit, in the Irish Sea off the coast of Lancashire. She was on a voyage from Liverpool, Lancashire to Cette, Hérault, France. She was refloated the next day and taken in to the River Wyre.
Sjordronningen	United Kingdom	The barque was driven ashore 1 nautical mile (1.9 km) east of Beachy Head, Sussex, United. Her sixteen crew were rescued by the Eastbourne Lifeboat William and Mary ( Royal National Lifeboat Institution). Sjordronningen was on a voyage from New York City, United States to Hamburg, Germany.
Wembdon	United Kingdom	The steamship struck the North and South Rock, off the coast of County Down, and sank. Her sixteen crew got aboard the North and South Rock Lightship ( Trinity House). Wembdon was on a voyage from Lisbon, Portugal to Troon, Ayrshire.

== 5 January ==
List of shipwrecks: 5 January 1887
Ship	State	Description
City of Bristol	United Kingdom	The smack was driven ashore and wrecked at Withernsea, Yorkshire.
St. George	United Kingdom	The Mersey Flat collided with the schooner Louisa (United Kingdom) at Liverpool, Lancashire and became severely leaky.

== 6 January ==
List of shipwrecks: 6 January 1887
Ship	State	Description
Achilles	United States	The steamship ran aground on a shoal 1 to 2 nautical miles (1.9 to 3.7 km; 1.2 to 2.3 mi) south of Block Island, Rhode Island. She later broke up and sank.
Eliezer	United Kingdom	The ship departed from the Laguna de Términos, Mexico for the English Channel. No further trace, reported overdue.
Muskota	Canada	The ship departed from Banjoewangie, Netherlands East Indies for the English Channel. No further trace, reported missing.
Western	United Kingdom	The steamship collided with the steamship Kenmore (United Kingdom) and sank in the River Thames at Barking, Essex. Her crew were rescued by Kenmore.

== 7 January ==
List of shipwrecks: 7 January 1887
Ship	State	Description
Bridget Annie	United Kingdom	The brigantine was driven ashore and wrecked in the Hilbre Islands, Cheshire. Her crew survived. She was on a voyage from Barrow-in-Furness, Lancashire to Salcombe, Devon.
City of Brussels	United Kingdom	The ocean liner was rammed and sunk by the ocean liner Kirby Hall (United Kingdom) in thick fog off Great Orme, Caernarfonshire or Liverpool, Lancashire. Eight crew and two passengers were killed.
Nor	Norway	The steamship was wrecked at Chesil Beach, Dorset, United Kingdom. Her crew were rescued by rocket apparatus. She was on a voyage from Cádiz, Spain to Bergen.
Rescue	United Kingdom	The tug was run into by the steamship W. S. Caine (United Kingdom) and sank in the River Mersey at Liverpool. Her crew were rescued.

== 9 January ==
List of shipwrecks: 9 January 1887
Ship	State	Description
Isabel	United Kingdom	The barque ran aground on the Galloper Sand, in the North Sea off the coast of Essex. She was refloated with the assistance of the smacks Gipsy and Zealous (both United Kingdom) but then ran aground on the Shipwash Sand, in the North Sea off the coast of Suffolk. She was refloated with assistance from the tug Harwich (United Kingdom) and towed in to Harwich, Essex.

== 10 January ==
List of shipwrecks: 10 January 1887
Ship	State	Description
Bolina	United Kingdom	The schooner sank south of Gugh, Isles of Scilly. Her crew were rescued. She was on a voyage from Portmadoc, Caernarfonshire, to London.
Caterina	Italy	The barque foundered near Milford Haven, Pembrokeshire, United Kingdom with the loss of all twelve crew. Also reported as having been wrecked on the Nash Sands in the Bristol Channel off the coast of Glamorgan, United Kingdom with the loss of all 13 people on board.
Firth of Olna	United Kingdom	The ship was sighted in the Indian Ocean whilst on a voyage from Banjoewangie, Netherlands East Indies to Lisbon, Portugal. No further trace, reported missing.
Forth	United Kingdom	The schooner ran aground on the Blackwater Bank, in the Irish Sea off the coast of County Wexford and was wrecked. Her crew were rescued by a lifeboat. She was on a voyage from Ayr to Wexford.

== 11 January ==
List of shipwrecks: 11 January 1887
Ship	State	Description
Celtic Monarch	United Kingdom	The steamship was abandoned 140 nautical miles (260 km) west of the Fastnet Rock. Her 29 crew were rescued by Lake Superior (United States). Celtic Monarch was on a voyage from Cardiff, Glamorgan to Philadelphia, Pennsylvania, United States.
Ella	Sweden	The barque ran aground and was wrecked in Belgrave Bay (Belle Grève), Guernsey, Channel Islands. There were no casualties. She was on a voyage from Gothenburg, Sweden, to Liverpool, Lancashire, United Kingdom.
Jane and Elizabeth	United Kingdom	The fishing smack was run into by the fishing smack Scotia (United Kingdom) and sank in the North Sea. Her crew were rescued by Scotia.
Twee Gezusters	United Kingdom	The dandy foundered off Swansea, Glamorgan with the loss of one of her four crew. Survivors were rescued by the tugs Fawn, Privateer and Times (all United Kingdom). Twee Gezusters was on a voyage from Lydney, Gloucestershire to Fremington, Devon.

== 12 January ==
List of shipwrecks: 12 January 1887
Ship	State	Description
Annie	United Kingdom	The steamship ran aground in the River Ouse at Goole, Yorkshire and was damaged. She was on a voyage from Goole to Calais, France.
Elizabeth	United Kingdom	The crewless Mersey Flat sprang a leak and sank at Liverpool, Lancashire.
Holland	United Kingdom	The steamship was driven ashore in the River Thames at Dartford, Kent.
Pongola	United Kingdom	The steamship ran aground off Weymouth, Dorset. She was on a voyage from the Natal Colony to London. She was refloated with the assistance of a number of tugs and taken in to Portland, Dorset.
Star	United Kingdom	The derelict smack was discovered 20 nautical miles (37 km) north north west of Great Orme Head, Caernarfonshire by Ann and Sarah and Gipsy Queen (both United Kingdom). She was towed in to Hoylake, Cheshire.
Unnamed	United Kingdom	The fishing trawler foundered in the North Sea off the coast of Northumberland with the loss of all hands.

== 13 January ==
List of shipwrecks: 13 January 1887
Ship	State	Description
Bridgit Annie	United Kingdom	Great Storm of 7 November 1890: The 100-ton schooner stranded on the rocks in Hilbre Islands the Hilbre Swash in a dense fog and sank. The next day, with the assistance of the tug Taliesin (United Kingdom), and Hoylake fishermen, she was floated off the rocks, and towed into Mostyn in sinking condition. She was repaired and returned to service.
Calliope	United Kingdom	The barque was driven ashore east of Beachy Head, Sussex. She was refloated.
Harbinger and Nordens Dronning	United Kingdom; Norway	The barque was run into by the steamship Fire Queen (United Kingdom) in the River Mersey and was severely damaged. In attempting to beach her at Egremont, Lancashire, United Kingdom, Nordens Dronning ran into the schooner Harbinger, which was also severely damaged.
Unnamed	United Kingdom	A schooner collided with the steamship Arizona (United Kingdom) and sank in the River Mersey. Her crew were rescued by Arizona.

== 14 January ==
List of shipwrecks: 14 January 1887
Ship	State	Description
Jackal	United Kingdom	The steam lighter sank at Greenock, Renfrewshire. She was later refloated.
Redcliffe	United Kingdom	The schooner struck the Barrel Rocks and foundered. Her crew were rescued. She was on a voyage from Newport, Monmouthshire to Waterford.

== 15 January ==
List of shipwrecks: 15 January 1887
Ship	State	Description
Industry	United Kingdom	The Thames barge was run into by a steamship in the River Thames at Charlton, Kent and was severely damaged. She was on a voyage from London to Lowestoft, Suffolk.
Theodosius Christian	Germany	The ship departed from Mobile, Alabama, United States for West Hartlepool, County Durham, United Kingdom. No further trace, reported missing.

== 16 January ==
List of shipwrecks: 16 January 1887
Ship	State	Description
Centurion	United Kingdom	The barque was driven ashore and wrecked at North Head, New South Wales. Her crew were rescued. She was on a voyage from Sydney to Newcastle, New South Wales.
Graville	France	The steamship was wrecked on Seghalah, in the Dahlak Archipelago, Eritrea. Her crew survived. She was on a voyage from Cardiff, Glamorgan, United Kingdom to Madras, India. The wreck was plundered by the local inhabitants then set afire.
Orwell	United Kingdom	The steamship collided with the steamship Sinbad in the River Thames at Plaistow, Essex and was beached.

== 17 January ==
List of shipwrecks: 17 January 1887
Ship	State	Description
Elizabeth Bennett	United Kingdom	The ship collided with the schooner Mary (United Kingdom) and was abandoned off the Goodwin Sands, Kent. Her five crew were rescued by Mary. Eliabeth Bennett was on a voyage from Rochester, Kent to Liverpool, Lancashire. She came ashore at Pegwell Bay, but was subsequently refloated and taken in to Ramsgate, Kent.
Hallowe'en	United Kingdom	The clipper was driven ashore between Hope Cove and Salcombe, Devon with the loss of one of her 27 crew. Twenty-four survivors were rescued the next day by the Hope Cove lifeboat Alexandra; two swam ashore. She was on a voyage from Fuzhou, China to London.
Stewart	United Kingdom	The ship ran aground on the North Bank, off Workington, Cumberland. She was on a voyage from Cardiff, Glamorgan to workington.
Wergeland	Norway	The ship departed from Belize City, British Honduras for Goole, Yorkshire, United Kingdom. No further trace, reported missing.

== 18 January ==
List of shipwrecks: 18 January 1887
Ship	State	Description
Argus	United Kingdom	The sloop was driven ashore and wrecked at Llangennith, Glamorgan. Her crew survived. She was on a voyage from Lannion, Côtes du Nord, France to Cardiff, Glamorgan.
Brentford	United Kingdom	The steamship was wrecked at Peniche, Portugal with the loss of all but one of her crew. She was on a voyage from Newport, Monmouthshire to Malta.
HMS Firm	Royal Navy	The Forester-class gunboat was driven ashore at Beadnell, Northumberland. Nineteen of her crew were rescued by rocket apparatus; the rest remaining aboard.
Theodore Birely	United States	The tug suffered a boiler explosion and sank at Fall River, Massachusetts. Her engineer died.

== 19 January ==
List of shipwrecks: 19 January 1887
Ship	State	Description
Kate	United Kingdom	The smack was run into and sunk in the Silver Pits by Caroline Augusta Sweden) Her crew were rescued by Caroline Augusta.

== 20 January ==
List of shipwrecks: 20 January 1887
Ship	State	Description
Defrance	Norway	The steamship was driven ashore at Usinish, South Uist, Outer Hebrides, United Kinjgdom with the loss of all hands. She was on a voyage from Liverpool, Lancashire to Blyth, Northumberland, United Kingdom.
Kapunda	United Kingdom	The full-rigged ship collided with the barque Ada Melmore (United Kingdom) off the coast of Brazil and sank with the loss of about 300 lives. Sixteen survivors were rescued by Ada Melmore.
Obock	France	The steamship collided with the smack Sir Robert Peel (United Kingdom) in the River Thames and was beached at East Greenwich, Middlesex, United Kingdom.

== 21 January ==
List of shipwrecks: 21 January 1887
Ship	State	Description
Marion	United Kingdom	The schooner ran aground on rocks at Coldingham, Berwickshire and was wrecked. She was on a voyage from Goole, Yorkshire to Perth.
Unnamed	China	The steamship collided with the steamship Nepaul (United Kingdom) and sank in the Huangpu River near the Gutzlaff Signal Tower, Shanghai with loss of life. Eighty of her crew were reported missing.

== 22 January ==
List of shipwrecks: 22 January 1887
Ship	State	Description
Gustave Aime	France	The brigantine was driven ashore at Gibraltar with the loss of her captain.
Hettie	United Kingdom	The steamship was wrecked on the Accitera Reef, off Cape Trafalgar, Spain. Her crew were rescued. She was on a voyage from Cardiff, Glamorgan to Gibraltar.
Klopemana	Flag unknown	The brig was driven ashore and sank at Gibraltar.
Laura Emma	United Kingdom	The schooner was driven ashore and sank at Gibraltar. She was refloated.
Marie Eugenie	France	The schooner was driven into the hulk No. 14 ( (United Kingdom of Great Britain and Ireland) Gibraltar) and damaged at Gibraltar.
Mater	Austria-Hungary	The brig was driven ashore at Gibraltar.
Minatitlan	United Kingdom	The schooner was driven ashore and sank at Gibraltar.
Ocean King	United States	The schooner was wrecked at sea. Her crew rescued on 9 February by C. B. Manning (Flag unknown).
Welsh Belle	United Kingdom	The schooner was driven ashore at Gibraltar. She was refloated and found to be severely leaky.

== 23 January ==
List of shipwrecks: 23 January 1887
Ship	State	Description
Barranca	United Kingdom	The ship was wrecked near Porthleven, Cornwall with the loss of all hands. She was on a voyage from London to East London, Cape Colony.

== 24 January ==
List of shipwrecks: 24 January 1887
Ship	State	Description
Amoy, and Thames	United Kingdom	The barque Amoy collided with the steamship Thames off the South Foreland, Kent and was severely damaged. She was on a voyage from San Francisco, California, United States to Sunderland, County Durham. Thames was on a voyage from Antwerp, Belgium to São Migyel Island, Azores. She was severely damaged and was taken in tow for the River Thames by the tug Dover (United Kingdom).
Francis Perkins	United States	The schooner was wrecked on the Barnegat shoals, off the coast of New Jersey with the loss of two of the nine people on board. Her wreck sank in 80 feet (24 m) of water.
Greata	United Kingdom	The steamship was driven ashore and severely damaged at North Queensferry, Fife.

== 25 January ==
List of shipwrecks: 25 January 1887
Ship	State	Description
Minerva	France	The schooner collided with the steamship Rayner (United Kingdom) and sank in the River Usk. Minerva was on a voyage from Bayonne, Basses-Pyrénées to Newport, Monmouthshire, United Kingdom.

== 26 January ==
List of shipwrecks: 26 January 1887
Ship	State	Description
Coniston Fell, and Ribble	United Kingdom	The steamship Ribble was in collision with Coniston Fell and sank in the Bristol Channel with the loss of two of her seven crew. Survivors were rescued by the lifeboat Wolverhampton II ( Royal National Lifeboat Institution). Coniston Fell was beached at The Mumbles, Glamorgan.
Unnamed	Italy	The barque was wrecked on the Nash Sands, Glamorgan, United Kingdom with the loss of all eleven crew.

== 27 January ==
List of shipwrecks: 27 January 1887
Ship	State	Description
Aagot	Norway	The schooner ran aground and was wrecked at East Wemyss, Fife, United Kingdom. She was on a voyage from East Wemyss to Haugesund.
Aberfeldy, and Mascotte	United Kingdom	The full-rigged ship Aberfeldy was run into by the steamship Mascotte and sank off Lowestoft, Suffolk. Her crew were rescued. She was on a voyage from San Francisco, California, United States to Hull, Yorkshire. Mascotte was severely damaged. She put in to Lowestoft waterlogged at the bow.
Beranger	France	The brig sprang a leak and sank 27 nautical miles (50 km) off Cezimbra, Portugal. She was on a voyage from Marseille, Bouches-du-Rhône to Nantes, Loire-Inférieure.
Lavinia	United Kingdom	The fishing trawler was run down and sunk 6 nautical miles (11 km) south of the Eddystone Rock by the steamship Opah (United Kingdom). Her crew were rescued.
Lindus	United Kingdom	The ship was driven ashore at Whitley, County Durham. She was refloated and taken in to the River Tyne.

== 28 January ==
List of shipwrecks: 28 January 1887
Ship	State	Description
Ada Melmore	United Kingdom	The barque collided with the full-rigged ship Kapunda (United Kingdom) off the coast of Brazil on 20 January causing Kapunda to sink. Sixteen survivors were rescued by Ada Melmore. Ada Melmore was damaged in the incident and was taking on water. She was able to transfer her crew and survivors to the barque Ulysse (France), losing two, and was abandoned to sink on 28 January.
Tancred	Norway	The barque ran aground in the River Ouse. She was being towed from Hull to Goole, Yorkshire, United Kingdom.

== 29 January ==
List of shipwrecks: 29 January 1887
Ship	State	Description
Brighton	United Kingdom	The paddle steamer struck a rock north of Guernsey, Channel Islands and foundered. All on board survived. She was on a voyage from Weymouth, Dorset to Guernsey.

== Unknown date ==
List of shipwrecks: Unknown date in January 1887
Ship	State	Description
Abel	Norway	The barque was driven ashore at Alnmouth, Northumberland, United Kingdom. Her crew survived. She was on a voyage from London to Blyth, Northumberland.
Alice Fisher	United Kingdom	The schooner was driven ashore at Llanlivet Major, Glamorgan and was abandoned by her crew. She was later refloated and taken in to Penarth, Glamorgan.
Altmore	United Kingdom	The ship was abandoned off Lobos Island, Canary Islands. She was on a voyage from Troon, Ayrshire to Matanzas, Cuba.
Amelia	United Kingdom	The schooner struck the Knavestone Rock and sank near Berwick-upon-Tweed, Northumberland. Her crew were rescued.
Annie Morice	United Kingdom	The schooner was abandoned in the English Channel. Her crew were rescued. She was on a voyage from Poole, Dorset to Rouen, Seine-Inférieure, France.
Badsworth	United Kingdom	The steamship was driven ashore at Garston, Lancashire. She was on a voyage from Cartagena, Spain to Liverpool. She was refloated and taken in to Rock Ferry, Cheshire.
Bahrenfeld	Germany	The steamship was driven ashore in the Dardanelles. She was refloated on 22 January and resumed her voyage.
Baltic	Norway	The steamship was driven ashore on Skagen, Denmark. She was on a voyage from Alloa, Clackmannanshire, United Kingdom to Libava, Courland Governorate.
Barbo	Norway	The barque was wrecked at "Murrillorofs, Cuba. She was on a voyage from the Black River, Jamaica to Goole, Yorkshire, United Kingdom.
Bertha	Germany	The ship was driven ashore on Fenwick Island, Delaware, United States. She was a total loss.
Bessarabia	United Kingdom	The steamship was damaged by fire at Charleston, South Carolina, United States.
Bittern	United Kingdom	The steamship ran aground on the Spijkerplaat, in the North Sea off the coast of Zeeland, Netherlands. She was on a voyage from Ghent, East Flanders, Belgium to Liverpool, Lancashire.
Blair Athole	United Kingdom	The steamship was thought to have foundered in the Black Sea 45 nautical miles (83 km) south of Serpent Island, Russia after 20 January. Wreckage thought to have come from the ship was sighted by the steamship Behara (United Kingdom).
Bore	Jamaica	The ship was driven ashore and wrecked at Port Maria.
Brentford	United Kingdom	The steamship wrecked at Peniche, Portugal with the loss of all but one of those on board.
Carl Christoph	Russia	The brigantine was driven ashore at Spurn Head, Yorkshire. She was on a voyage from Riga to Boston, Lincolnshire, United Kingdom.
Charger	United States	The schooner was lost on a voyage from Ipswich, Massachusetts to Boston, Massachusetts. Lost with all four hands.
Charlotte Ann	United Kingdom	The ship was driven ashore at Cemlyn, Anglesey. She was on a voyage from Connah's Quay, Flintshire to Milford Haven, Pembrokeshire.
Chesapeake	United Kingdom	The brigantine ran aground and was damaged at Demerara, British Honduras.
City of Augusta	United States	The ship was driven ashore. She was refloated and taken in to Savannah, Georgia.
Delaware	United States	The steamship was driven ashore in St. Andrew's Sound. She was on a voyage from New York to Fernandina.
Egret	Flag unknown	The steamship was driven ashore and severely damaged at Maassluis, South Holland, Netherlands. She was later refloated.
Elizabeth	Germany	The full-rigged ship was driven ashore and wrecked at Cape Henry, Virginia, United States. Two lifeboats took off the crew, but were swamped by a large wave. All of Elizabeth's crew and five of the rescuers were drowned. Elizabeth was on a voyage from Hamburg to Baltimore, Maryland, United States.
Elphinstone	United Kingdom	The steamship was run into by the steamship B. Grainger (UKGBI) at Cardiff, Glamorgan and was beached.
Ensign	United Kingdom	The schooner ran aground off Punta Mala, Spain. She was on a voyage from Livorno, Italy to Bilbao, Spain.
Esperance	France	The ship was driven ashore and wrecked at Dundrum, County Down, United Kingdom.
Fawn	United Kingdom	The ketch collided with a steamship and was beached at Port Eynon, Glamorgan. Her crew were rescued.
Franceschino	Italy	The barque was driven ashore at Portogoro. She was on a voyage from Philadelphia, Pennsylvania, United States to Venice.
George R. Crowe	United Kingdom	The barque was destroyed by fire at Brisbane, Queensland.
Hangchow	China	The steamship was driven ashore and wrecked at "Tsingseu". She was refloated in February and taken in to Amoy.
Hangereid	Norway	The barque collided with the steamship W. J. Radcliffe (United Kingdom) and was abandoned by her crew. Hagereid was subsequently taken in to Dover, Kent, United Kingdom.
Harvest Maid	United Kingdom	The schooner was driven ashore on Walney Island, Lancashire. She was on a voyage from Charlestown, Cornwall to Fleetwood, Lancashire.
Harvey Mills	United States	The ship foundered off the coast of California with the loss of 21 lives.
Hematite	United Kingdom	The ship ran aground on the Blackstraw Bank, off the coast of Wigtownshire.
Inchmarnock	United Kingdom	The ship was lost at sea. Her crew were rescued by Sydenham (United Kingdom). Inchmarnock was on a voyage from Surabaya, Netherlands East Indies to a British port.
Ipswich	United Kingdom	The steamship ran aground in the Scheldt at Borsele, Zeeland. She was on a voyage from Harwich, Essex to Antwerp, Belgium.
J. B. Gray	United Kingdom	The schooner was driven ashore at Faro, Portugal. She was on a voyage from Cardiff to Faro. She was later refloated and towed in to Faro, where she was condemned.
John and Sarah Ann	United Kingdom	The smack was driven ashore 3 nautical miles (5.6 km) south of Filey, Yorkshire.
Jules	United Kingdom	The schooner was driven ashore at Lindisfarne, Northumberland. She was on a voyage from Arbroath, Forfarshire to Sunderland, County Durham. She was refloated and completed her voyage in a leaky condition.
King's Cross	United Kingdom	The steamship ran aground at Monster, South Holland. She was on a voyage from Odesa, Russia to Rotterdam, South Holland. She was refloated with the assistance of a number of tugs.
Lorenzino	Italy	The barque was driven ashore at "Mandarts Droogte". She was on a voyage from Panaroekan, Java, Netherlands East Indies to Lisbon, Portugal.
Leon Veneto	Italy	The barque sank at Alexandria, Egypt. She was on a voyage from Naples to Alexandria.
Lotus	United Kingdom	The ship was driven ashore at Long Beach, New York, United States. She was on a voyage from Fowey, Cornwall to New York City. She was a total loss.
Louisa	United Kingdom	The dandy was beached at the Mumbles, Glamorgan.
Lydia	Sweden	The barque was driven ashore near Varberg. She was on a voyage from Hartlepool, County Durham to Varberg.
Maria	Norway	The schooner ran aground at Wells-next-the-Sea, Norfolk, United Kingdom. She was on a voyage from Wells-next-the-Sea to Dublin, United Kingdom.
Messenger	United Kingdom	The fishing trawler was driven ashore and wrecked at Preston, Devon. Her crew were rescued.
Onni	Norway	The barque ran aground in the Savannah River. She was refloated and put back to Savannah, Georgia for repairs.
Oxenholme	United Kingdom	The steamship was driven ashore at Norfolk, Virginia, United States. She was on a voyage from Norfolk to Liverpool. She was refloated and resumed her voyage, but subsequently ran aground at Small Point, Maine.
Paul Thormann	Flag unknown	The ship put in to Mauritius on fire. She was severely damaged.
Pheasant	United Kingdom	The smack was driven ashore and wrecked at New Brighton, Cheshire. She was on a voyage from Caernarfon to Liverpool.
Pickwick	United Kingdom	The ship ran aground at the Île-d'Aix, Charente-Inférieure, France.
Planter	United Kingdom	The ship was wrecked at "Mahela", Natal Colony.
Port Adelaide	United Kingdom	The steamship caught fire at Norfolk, Virginia. The fire was extinguished.
Prince de Conde	France	The barque ran aground on Sarn Badrig, in Carnarvon Bay. She was refloated.
Prinz Georg	Germany	The ship ran aground in the Schuylkill River. She was refloated and resumed her voyage.
Prosperino Palosso	Italy	The ship sank at Alexandria. She was on a voyage from Batoum, Russia to Alexandria.
Proteus	United States	The barque was sunk by ice in the Delaware River.
Recta	United Kingdom	The steamship ran aground at Gallipoli, Ottoman Empire.
Rivas	Spain	The steamship was driven ashore at Bilbao. She was on a voyage from the River Tyne to Bilbao.
Sara Anderson	United Kingdom	The barque was lost with all on board. She was on a voyage from Coquimbo, Chile to an English port.
Silo	Norway	The barque was wrecked on the coast of Tabasco, Mexico.
Skandia	Flag unknown	The ship was driven ashore and sank near Malmö, Sweden. She was on a voyage from Alloa to Pillau, Germany.
HMS Starling	Royal Navy	The gunboat ran aground at "Taedlain Island" before 10 January. She was refloated.
Stahleck	Germany	The steamship was driven ashore on Amager, Denmark. She was on a voyage from Karlshamn, Sweden to Barcelona, Spain.. She was refloated with assistance and taken in to Copenhagen, Denmark.
St. Peter	United Kingdom	The fishing trawler collided with the fishing trawler Argo and sank in the Irish Sea. Her crew were rescued.
Stratheden	United Kingdom	The steamship was wrecked in the Paracel Islands. Her crew were rescued; three by the steamship Olympia (Germany, the rest by Chinese junks.
Swan	United Kingdom	The ketch collided with a steamship and was beached at Port Eynon.
Thorwaldsen	Flag unknown	The ship was driven ashore at "Oosterhorn". She was on a voyage from Riga to Antwerp. She was later refloated and taken in to Brouwershaven, Zeeland, Netherlands.
Topinamba	Portugal	The brigantine was wrecked at "Bujurn", Brazil. Her crew were rescued.
Tordenskjold	Norway	The brig was driven ashore and wrecked at "Porto Plata".
Tweed	United Kingdom	The steamship was driven ashore at "Ringene", Norway. She was on a voyage from Sevastopol, Russia to Christiania, Norway.
Tweed	United Kingdom	The steamship was run into by the steamship Hochfeld (Germany) in the River Thames and was beached at Thames Haven, Essex. Tweed was on avoyage from the River Tyne to London.
Ulrikke	Flag unknown	The ship was driven ashore at Bahía Blanca, Argentina. She was refloated and found to be severely leaky.
Vigilant	United Kingdom	The schooner struck the Plough Seat Rock, off the coast of Northumberland. She was on a voyage from Lossiemouth, Moray to Sunderland. She put in to Berwick upon Tweed in a leaky condition.
Ville de Brest	France	The steamship ran aground at Tripoli, Ottoman Tripolitania. She was on a voyage from Malta to Tripoli. She was refloated.
Vindolana	United Kingdom	The steamship was driven ashore at St. Margaret's Bay, Kent. She was on a voyage from Alexandria to London. She was refloated on 20 January with assistance from the tugs Challenge and Granville (both United Kingdom) and resumed her voyage.
Viola	United Kingdom	The ship ran aground in Princess Bay, New Jersey. She was on a voyage from Barrow-in-Furness, Lancashire to Perth Amboy, New Jersey. She was later refloated and taken in to Perth Amboy.
Wans Fell	United Kingdom	The steamship ran aground in the River Avon. She was on a voyage from Liverpool to Bristol, Gloucestershire. She was refloated and found to be severely leaky.
Willesden	United Kingdom	The steamship ran aground on the Grestian Bank, in the English Channel off the coast of Seine-Inférieure and was wrecked. Her crew were rescued. She was on a voyage from New Orleans, Louisiana, United States to Rouen.
William	United Kingdom	The ship was driven ashore in Spanish Bay. She was on a voyage from Trapani, Sicily, Italy to Harbour Grace, Newfoundland Colony. She was refloated and assisted in to Harbour Grace.
Yves et Alphonse Conseit	France	The steamship, a coaster was wrecked at Chardonnières, Haiti. Her crew were rescued.
