= Churston Woods =

Woodland in Devon, England

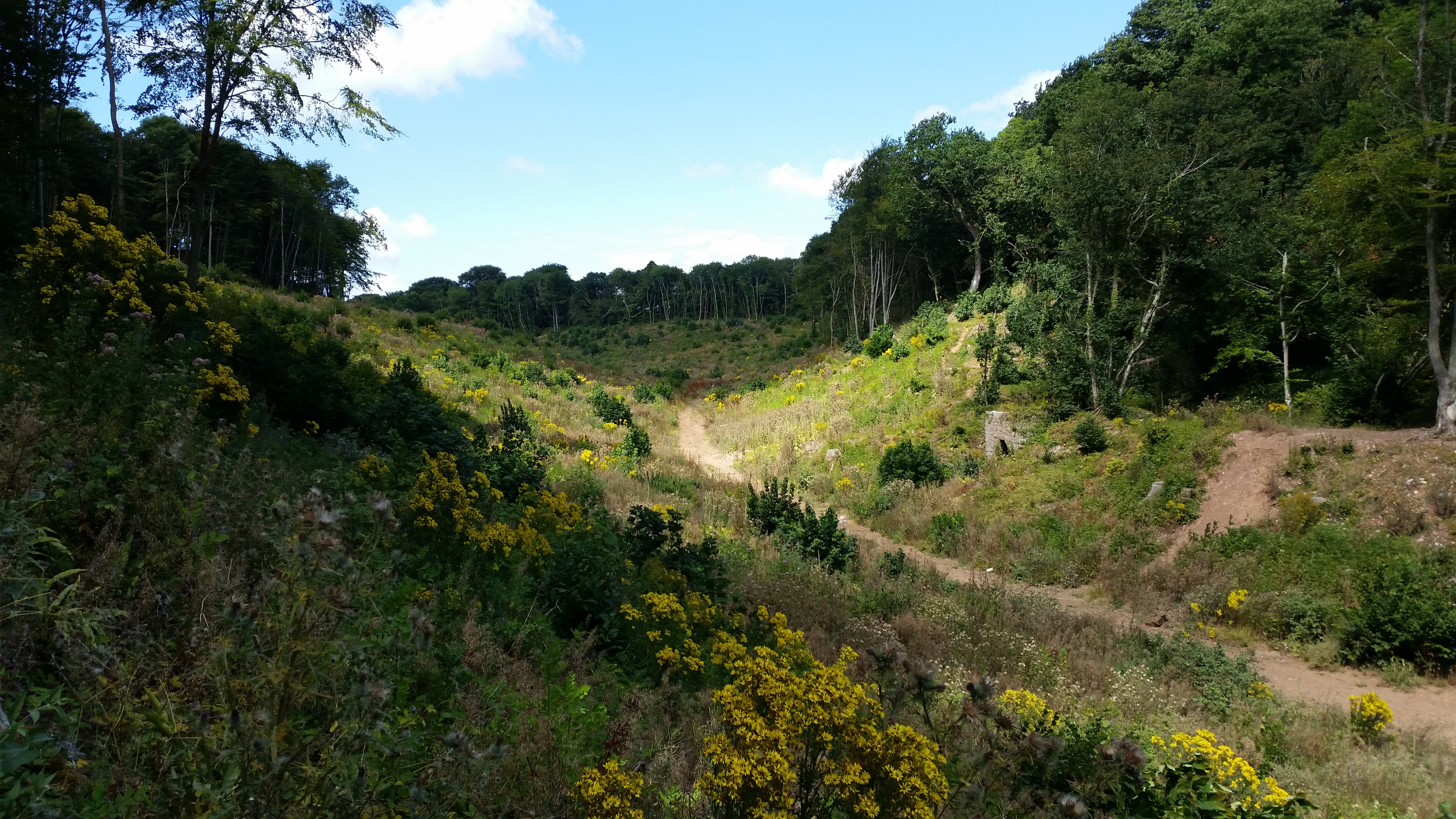
- Churston Woods

- Location within Devon
- Interactive map of Churston Woods

Geography
- Location: Devon, South West England
- Coordinates: 50.401647°N 3.527850°W

Churston Woods is an area of semi-ancient woodland near the village of Churston Ferrers and the town of Brixham. The woodland is made up of two main sections called The Grove and Ball Copse, both of which are owned by Torbay Council and managed by Torbay Coast and Countryside Trust.

== Description ==
The woodland is situated on the coast between the towns of Paignton and Brixham. The area is designated as a part of the South Devon Area of Outstanding Natural Beauty, one of a number of similarly protected landscapes within the United Kingdom. There are multiple entrances to the woods, including one at the end of a lane near Churston Court and one above Fishcombe Cove in Brixham. The South West Coast Path and the John Musgrave Heritage Trail pass through the woodland. As of 2018, the main path leads through the cleared area at the heart of the woodland, which is now composed primarily of shrubs and saplings, from the lane near Churston to Churston Cove.

== History ==
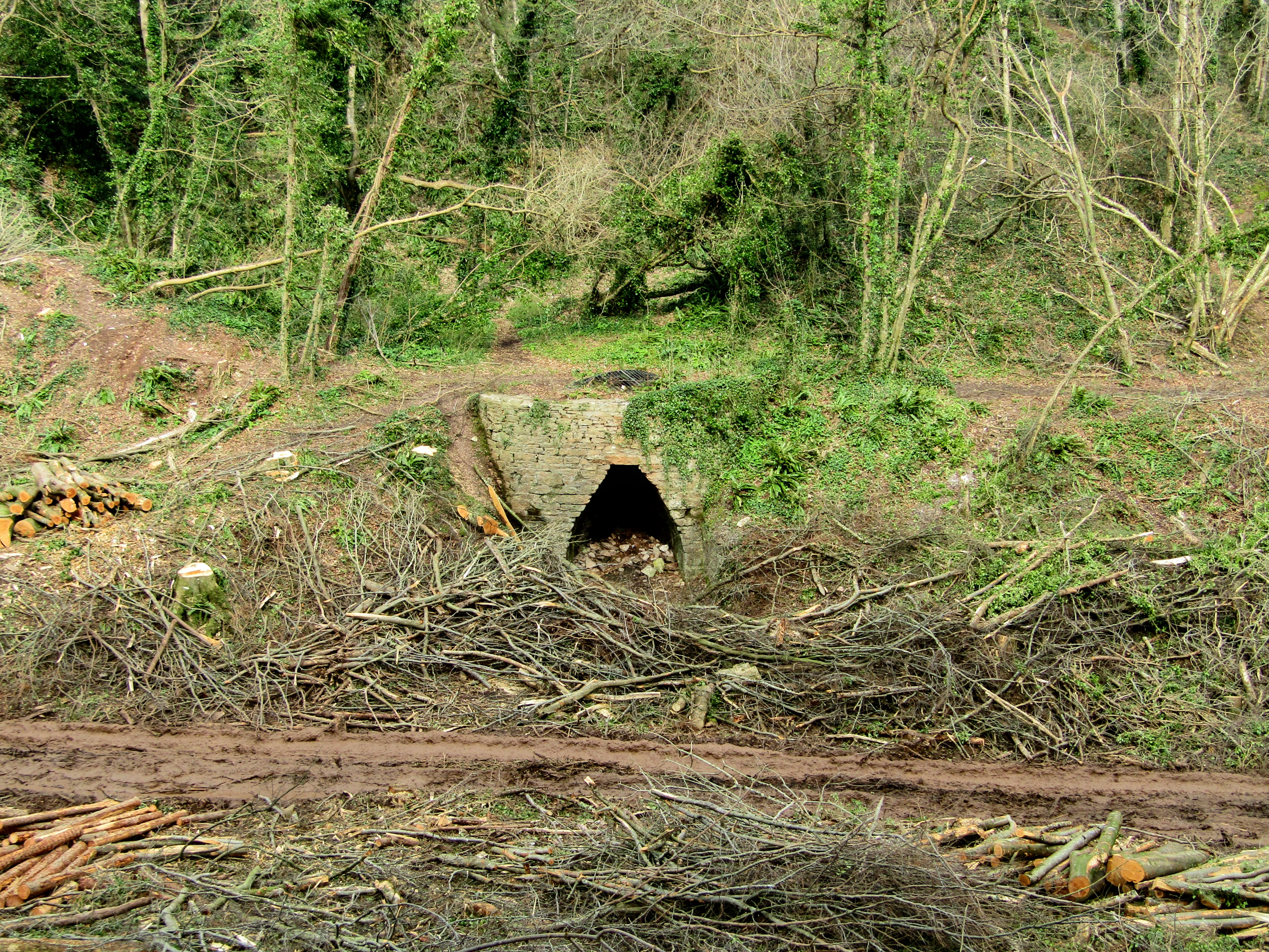
A limekiln in the valley

Churston Woods is home to a collection of now disused lime kilns including one on either side of the valley near Churston Cove with associated quarries. Limestone from the quarries was burnt with coal in the kilns to produce quicklime, which was used in the production of whitewash and mortar for buildings and was used by farmers as a means of improving soil for agriculture.

== Felling and replanting ==
In January 2017 it was reported that the Forestry Commission had discovered that numerous trees had been infected by Phytophthora ramorum, a disease that can kill a range of tree and plant species. The Commission ordered that all larch along with sweet chestnut trees that showed signs of infection be felled by the 31st of March that year.

Soon after the felling, the replanting of the heart of the woodland was planned. In May 2018, Torbay Coast and Countryside Trust reported that the replanting of the heart of the woodland had been completed. This was supported by local individuals and groups, with four days of community planting taking place. A total of 4800 trees were planted, 1000 of which were planted on the community days. The species planted were native, predominantly oak trees.
