= Hope Cove Lifeboat Station =

Former RNLI lifeboat station in Devon, England

Hope Cove RNLI Lifeboat Station

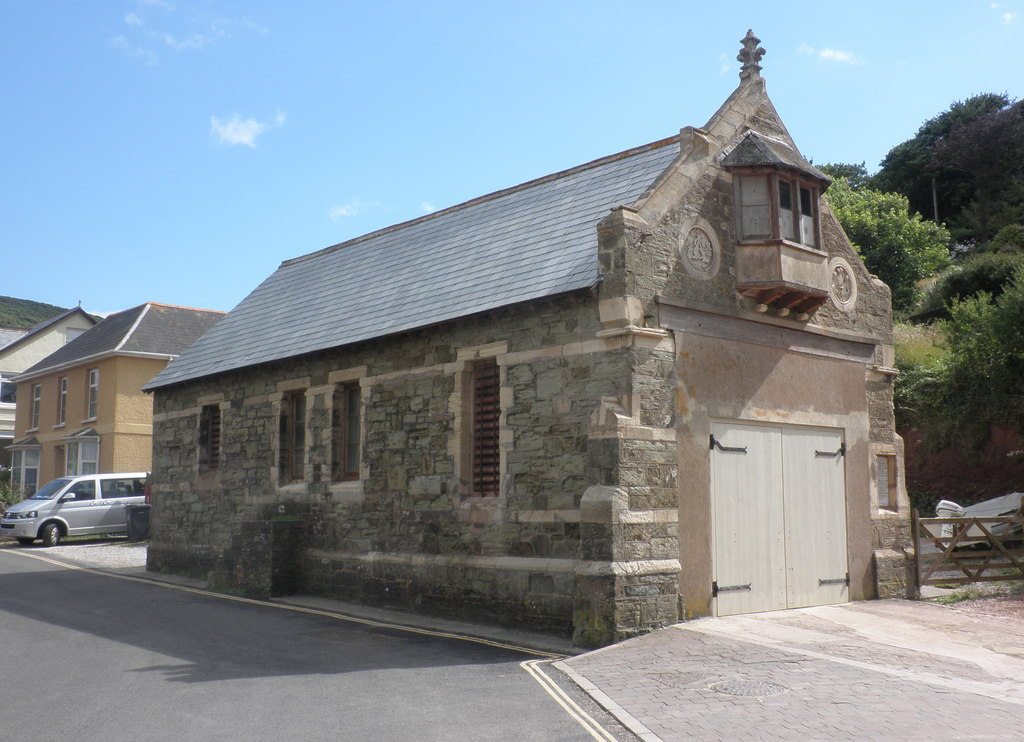
- Former Lifeboat Station, Hope Cove

- Location within Devon

General information
- Status: Closed
- Type: RNLI Lifeboat Station
- Location: Old Lifeboat House, Hope Cove, Devon, TQ7 3HP, England
- Coordinates: 50°14′31.4″N 3°51′33.4″W
- Opened: 1878
- Closed: 1930

Listed Building – Grade II
- Feature: Former lifeboat station
- Designated: 31 October 1986
- Reference no.: 1324899

Hope Cove Lifeboat Station, is a former Royal National Lifeboat Institution (RNLI) Lifeboat Station, located at Hope Cove, a seaside hamlet approximately 15 nautical miles (28 km) south-east of Plymouth, on the south east coast of Devon.

A lifeboat was first placed at Hope Cove by the RNLI in 1878.

After 52 years of operation, Hope Cove RNLI Lifeboat Station closed in 1930.

In 1992, an Independent lifeboat service was established at Hope Cove. For further information, please see:

- Hope Cove Life Boat

== History ==
On the report and recommendation of the Inspector of Lifeboats, following his visit at the invitation of local residents, it was decided at the meeting of the RNLI committee of management on 1 March 1877, to establish a lifeboat station at Hope Cove, near Salcombe, Devon.

On 6 September 1877, a further meeting of the committee reported the "munificent" contribution of £4000 from the United Grand Lodge of Freemasons of England, for the establishment of two lifeboat stations, to be maintained in perpetuity, in commemoration of the safe return from India of the Most Worshipful Grand Master, H.R.H. Albert Edward, Prince of Wales. The two stations to be opened would be at Clacton-on-Sea and Hope Cove. The new boat for Clacton would be named Albert Edward after the Prince, whilst the Hope Cove lifeboat would take the name of his wife, Alexander. Thanks were formally given to the Freemasons for their generosity.

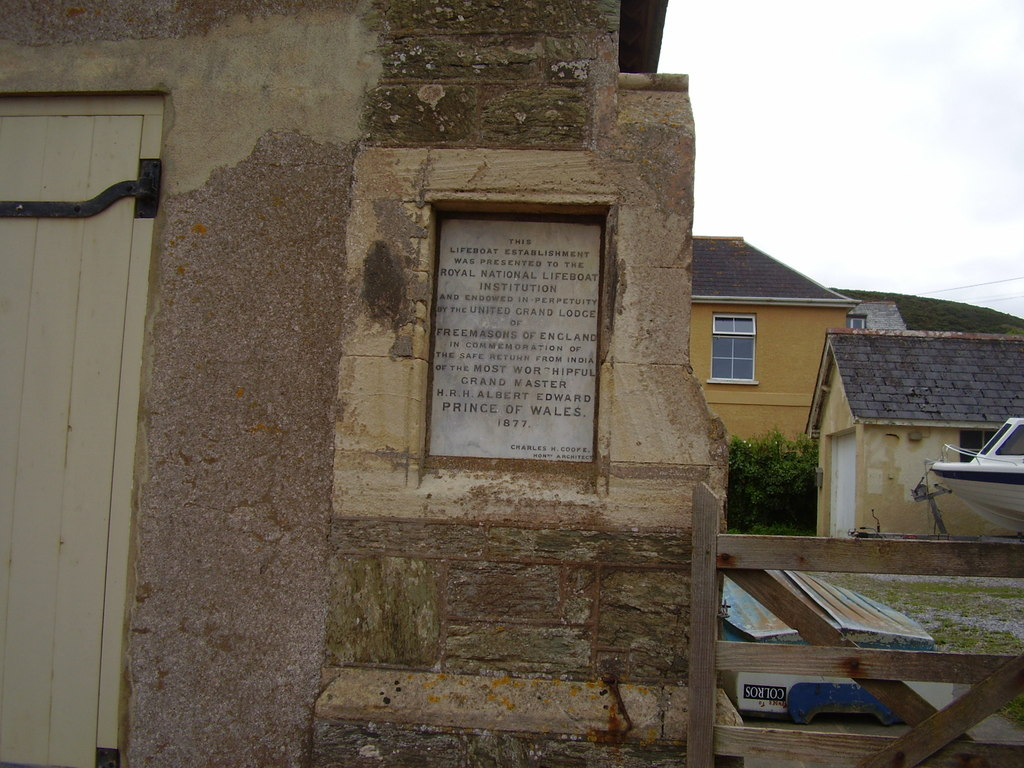
Freemasons plaque

A celebration of the arrival of the new lifeboat was organised by the Freemasons, and held in Kingsbridge, 5 miles (8.0 km) to the north east of Hope Cove. On 13 June 1878, the 35-foot self-righting 'Pulling and Sailing (P&S) lifeboat, one with (10) oars and sails, was drawn in a grand procession through the town to the quay, on its carriage pulled by eight horses, with the streets of the town decorated in flags, and the day given as a general holiday. After a service of dedication and blessing, the lifeboat was handed to the care of Admiral John R. Ward, representative of the RNLI. Afterwards, the boat was formally named Alexandra, and launched on demonstration in front of the large crowd. The lifeboat was later transferred to Hope Cove, where a large new boathouse had been constructed, on a site granted by the Earl of Devon. A large plaque was inset into the front gable.

It would be nine years before the signwriter was required to add an entry to the Hope Cove Service Board, but when the lifeboat was finally called, it was worth the wait. The clipper Halloween had been driven ashore at Soar Mill Sands, between Hope Cove and Salcombe on 17 January 1887, on passage from Foochow (Fuzhou) to London. Three men attempted to swim ashore with a line, but each time, the line was let go, and one man was lost. The lifeboat was launched at 08:30 the following day, and the remaining crew of the Halloween, reports vary between 19 and 24 men, were rescued from the rigging, where they had been all night.

A new lifeboat was sent to Hope Cove later in 1887, when the original lifeboat was condemned as unfit, and withdrawn from service. Fractionally smaller at 34-feet, the new lifeboat would be named Alexandra (ON 143) as per the wishes of the Freemasons. It would be another nine years before her only rescue, which would come in 1896 (see Blesk of Russia).

In 1900, Alexandra (ON 143) was also deemed unfit for service, as water had penetrated and rotted the diagonal planking. A temporary lifeboat, the Willie Rogers (ON 331), previously at Newquay and Rye Harbour, was transferred to the station, and renamed Alexandra on arrival. The lifeboat never launched on service, and was replaced in 1903.

The last lifeboat to serve at Hope Cove was a 35-foot (12-oared) Liverpool-class (P&S) lifeboat, arriving on station in 1903, and again named Alexandra (ON 514). When the steamship Jebba ran aground at Bolt Tail in thick fog, on passage from West Africa to Plymouth and Liverpool, with 79 passengers, and 76 crew, the Hope Cove lifeboat was called, but found it impossible to get close. A rescue would have required all aboard to be dragged through the waves by line. Lifeboat man Isaac Jarvis, and another man, Jack Argent, scaled the cliffs, in the dark, but well known to them from their childhood. They set up a breeches buoy system, and managed to bring ashore 117 people. The rest were rescued in other ways. The two men both received the Albert Medal for Lifesaving.

The four Hope Cove lifeboats would be launched just 10 times in 52 years, but saved 64 lives. At a meeting of the RNLI committee of management on Thursday 10 April 1930, along with Ardrossan, Looe and Mevagissey, it was decided to close Hope Cove Lifeboat Station.

The station building still stands, and is believed to be recently sold for re-purposing. The lifeboat on station at the time of closure, Alexandra (ON 514), was transferred to Cromer No.2 station. The boat still exists, last reported as a holiday home at the Isle of Seil in 2023.

In 1992, a lifeboat service was re-established at Hope Cove. A 6.5 m (21 ft) RIB named Alexandra has been in service since 2013. For further information, please see:

- Hope Cove Life Boat

== Blesk of Russia ==
The Russian steamship Blesk was one of the first ships specifically designed to carry oil. On 1 December 1896, the vessel was on passage from Odessa to Hamburg, loaded with 3180 tons of Petro-oil. Mistaking Eddystone Lighthouse for La Corbière Lighthouse in Jersey, at 21:00, the vessel ran straight into Greystone Rock at their full speed of 10 knots. The Hope Cove lifeboat was launched, and in two trips, rescued all 43 crew. This was however, probably the first large scale ecological disaster to affect the UK shore. At first, visitors came to see the black oil floating on the water, but soon the effects were overwhelming. The fumes and stench made people ill, and it was said you could smell the oil from 20 miles away. The fish stocks were decimated, and every tide brought ashore dead sea creatures, crabs, lobsters etc. The effects of the wreck were long felt around Hope Cove and Salcombe.

== Station honours ==
The following are awards made at Hope Cove.

- Albert Medal for Lifesaving

Isaac Jarvis - 1907
Jack Argent - 1907

== Hope Cove RNLI lifeboats ==
=== Pulling and Sailing (P&S) lifeboats ===
ON (Note: ON is the RNLI's Official Number of the boat.)	Name	Built	On Station	Class	Comments
Pre-620	Alexandra	1878	1878−1887	35-foot Self-righting (P&S)	(Note: 35-foot x 9-foot (10-oared) self-righting (P&S) lifeboat, costing £397.)
143	Alexandra	1887	1887−1900	34-foot Self-righting (P&S)	(Note: 34-foot x 8-foot (10-oared) self-righting (P&S) lifeboat, built by Hansen of Cowes, costing £347.)
331	Alexandra	1892	1900−1903	34-foot Self-righting (P&S)	(Note: 34-foot x 8-foot (10-oared) self-righting (P&S) lifeboat, built by R. McAlister of Dumbarton, costing £420.)
514	Alexandra	1903	1903−1922	35-foot Liverpool (P&S)	(Note: 35-foot x 10-foot (12-oared) Liverpool-class (P&S) lifeboat, built by Thames Ironworks of Blackwall, London, costing £800.)
Station Closed 1922–1924
514	Alexandra	1903	1924−1930	35-foot Liverpool (P&S)	

Pre ON numbers are unofficial numbers used by the Lifeboat Enthusiast Society to reference early lifeboats not included on the official RNLI list.

== See also ==
- Independent lifeboats in Britain and Ireland
- List of former RNLI stations
- List of RNLI stations
