= South Huish =

Village in Devon, England

Coordinates: 50.255378°N 3.8314498°W

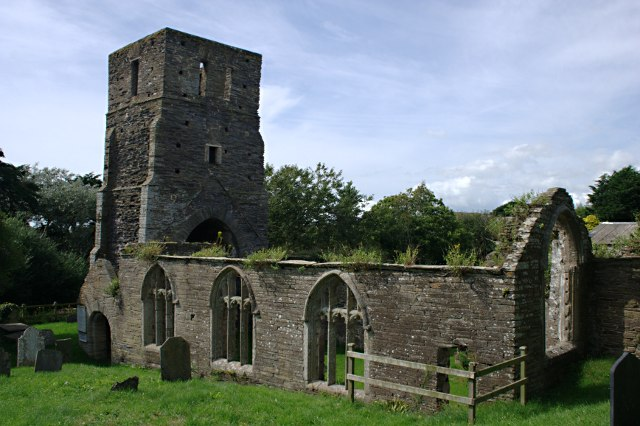
- St Andrew's Church

- Location within Devon
- Area: 5.8897 km^{2} (2.2740 sq mi)
- Population: 459 (2021)
  - Density: 78/km^{2} (200/sq mi)
- Civil parish: South Huish
- District: South Hams
- Shire county: Devon
- Region: South West
- Country: England
- Sovereign state: United Kingdom
- Police: Devon and Cornwall
- Fire: Devon and Somerset
- Ambulance: South Western

South Huish is a village and civil parish about 4 miles south west of Kingsbridge, in the South Hams district, in the county of Devon, England. The parish includes Galmpton and Hope Cove. According to the 2021 census the parish had a population of 459. The parish touches West Alvington, South Milton and Malborough. The parish is in the South Devon Area of Outstanding Natural Beauty.

== Features ==
St Andrew's Church is a ruined Grade II* listed building. There is a school in Malborough called Malborough With South Huish Church Of England Primary School. South Huish Reserve is located in a shallow valley cut off from the sea by the dunes behind South Milton Sands and is in the ownership of the National Trust which took ownership in 2011. Devon Birds has managed it since 1994. There are 27 listed buildings in South Huish.

== History ==
The name "Huish" means household. South Huish was recorded in the Domesday Book as Hewis/Heuis and had a population of 12, both South Huish and Galmpton had Ralph as a holder. Alternative names for South Huish are "Huish South" and "Huish". The parish was historically in the Stanborough hundred. The site of a submarine forest was uncovered in 1923.
