= Galmpton =

Galmpton may refer to:

== Places ==
- Galmpton, Torbay, a village in Devon, UK
- Galmpton, South Hams, a hamlet in Devon, UK
