= St Andrew's Church, South Huish =

Coordinates: 50.2555°N 3.8318°W

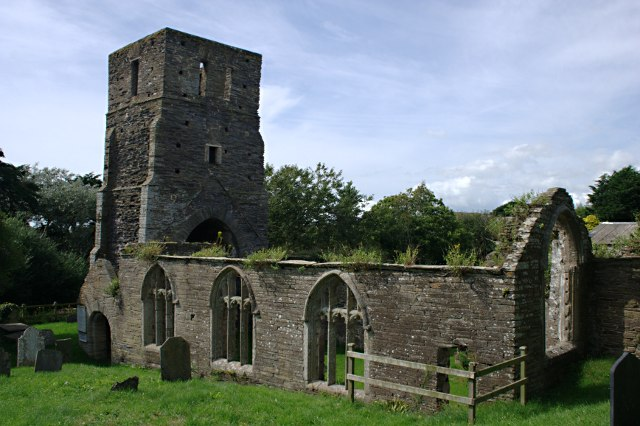
- The ruins of St Andrew's Church, South Huish, from the southeast

- Location in Devon
- OS grid reference: SX 695 411
- Location: South Huish, South Hams, Devon
- Country: England
- Denomination: Anglican
- Website: Friends of Friendless Churches

History
- Dedication: Saint Andrew

Architecture
- Functional status: Ruin
- Heritage designation: Grade II*
- Designated: 26 January 1967
- Architectural type: Church
- Groundbreaking: 13th century
- Completed: 15th century

Specifications
- Materials: Slatestone

St Andrew's Church is a ruined church in South Huish, South Hams, Devon, England. It is recorded in the National Heritage List for England as a designated Grade II* listed building, and is under the care of the Friends of Friendless Churches.

== Early history ==
The nave and chancel were built in the 13th century. The west tower, and possibly the north transept, were probably added in the early 15th century. Minor alterations to the south door and insertion of the east window to the chancel occurred in the late 15th or early 16th century, but immediately after this, major work was carried out to the south side of the church. This comprised an integral porch and south aisle, probably built between c.1520 and 1540. This included insertion of a carved and painted oak rood screen dividing the nave from the chancel and the south aisle from the lady chapel. A parclose screen was provided between this and the chancel, while a hagioscope or squint was cut into the north wall of the chancel to enable worshippers in the north transept to view the celebration of mass in the chancel. n 1553, four bells were recorded, at least two of which had probably been there since the 15th century when the tower was built, with the number being made up to four, probably in the early-mid 16th century when the tower was heightened. This number had increased to six by the early 19th century. However, by 1866, the condition of the church had deteriorated, perhaps due to population movement away from South Huish to the nearby village of Galmpton, about half a mile to the south, and the old church was considered to be beyond repair. A new church was built in Galmpton to replace it. The bells and font were moved to the new church and St Andrew's was abandoned. Also removed to Galmpton were the broken remains of two 15th-century alabaster reredoses depicting scenes from the life of Christ. Before this time, the stoup has been removed to Salcombe parish church. The other fittings were sold. The late medieval screen was removed to Bowringsleigh House in West Alvington. The south aisle arcade went to the church at Dodbrooke. The bench ends were acquired by the Earl of Devon and it is thought that they were installed in the chapel at Powderham Castle.

== Architecture ==
The church is built in slate stone. It is now without a roof, but the walls, other than those of the transept, are largely intact. The ruins include a blocked west doorway, above which is a damaged Perpendicular window and a round-headed south porch. The porch dates from the early-mid 16th century and contains stone benches along its sides and a flue on its western face. On the north wall of the nave is the frame of a lancet window; there are two similar window frames in the chancel. The interior of the church has been stripped of almost all of its former features, but in an archaeological survey of 2005, undertaken by Robert Waterhouse BA, MIfA, three image brackets were identified in the porch, nave and lady chapel.

== Recent history ==
In 1976, the ruins were vested in the charity the Friends of Friendless Churches. The charity holds a 999-year lease with effect from 1 January 1976. Soon after vesting, the top 8 feet (2 m) of the tower was removed. In 1988, one of the granite windows was reconstructed from fallen stones on the site. Work has been undertaken to slow down the decay of the remaining structure. An annual service continues to be held at the site.
