= Richard Godfrey (potter) =

English studio potter

Richard Godfrey (1949 – 13 December 2014) was an English studio potter working in Battisborough Cross, Devon England.

== Early life and education ==
Godfrey graduated from Bristol School of Art in 1972 having been taught by Gillian Lowndes.

== Career ==
From 1973 to 1981 he was Head of Art and Deputy Headmaster at Battisborough International School, Devon which was founded by Kurt Hahn. Having set up his first workshop, he made production thrown ware for Cranks restaurant. Godfrey was a fellow of the Craft Potters Association and known primarily for his brightly coloured earthenware pottery which used composite underglaze patterns.

Godfrey won the Bronze award at the European Ceramics Competition in Athens 2004 and at the Art in Clay festival in 2013 he was voted winner of the Valentine Clays Peers Award for best contribution to the festival. He lectured, demonstrated and exhibited widely and was the subject of two television documentaries.

Godfrey's work combined thrown and hand built forms made with white earthenware clay, inspired by observing his surroundings and found objects. His teapots were often made using non traditional press moulding techniques, utilising cut cardboard boxes. Potter Hannah McAndrew described his work as "bright beasts, immaculately made, vibrant and smiling". Godfrey died on 13 December 2014 after suffering with cancer for two years.
