= SS Jebba =

Coordinates: 50°14′32″N 3°52′00″W

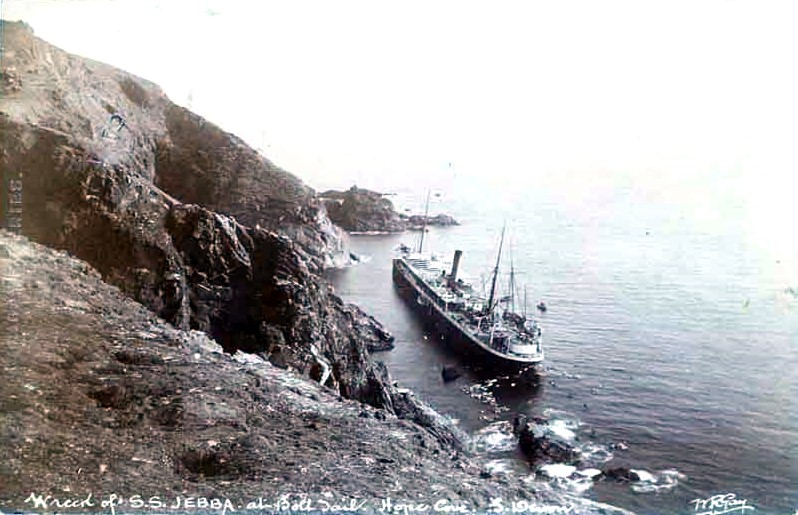
- Jebba aground on Bolt Tail, Devon in 1907

History
- Name: 1896: Albertville; 1898 : Jebba
- Namesake: 1896: Albertville, Belgian Congo; 1898: Jebba, Nigeria
- Owner: 1896: Cie Belge-Maritime du Congo; 1898: African Steamship Co
- Operator: 1898: Elder, Dempster & Co
- Port of registry: 1896: (Belgium) Antwerp; 1898: (United Kingdom) London
- Builder: Sir Raylton Dixon & Co, Middlesbrough
- Yard number: 421
- Launched: 16 April 1896
- Completed: June 1896
- Identification: 1896: code letters MBCH; 1898: UK official number 109969; 1898: code letters QGVN
- Fate: Wrecked on rocks, 1907

General characteristics
- Type: Cargo liner
- Tonnage: 1897: 3,953 GRT, 2,997 NRT
- Length: 352.0 ft (107.3 m)
- Beam: 44.2 ft (13.5 m)
- Depth: 23.4 ft (7.1 m)
- Decks: 2
- Installed power: 419 NHP
- Propulsion: 1 × screw; 1 × triple expansion engine
- Speed: 12 knots (22 km/h)
- Capacity: at least 79 passengers; 1904: included 6,000 cubic feet (170 m^{3}) refrigerated cargo space
- Crew: 76

SS Jebba was a steamship that was built in Middlesbrough in 1896 and wrecked on the south coast of Devon in 1907. She was launched as Albertville for the Compagnie Belge-Maritime du Congo (CBMC), and was renamed Jebba when Elder, Dempster & Co acquired her in 1898. She was the first of four CBMC ships to be called Albertville, and the first of two Elder, Dempster ships to be called Jebba.

== Building ==
The CBMC was founded in January 1895 to operate merchant ships between Belgium and the Belgian Congo. Sir Raylton Dixon & Co in Middlesbrough on the River Tees built all of the CBMC's early ships. The first, Léopoldville, was a cargo ship that was completed in January 1895.

Albertville was designed slightly larger, and with some passenger accommodation. She was launched on 16 April 1896 and completed that June. She was named after the town of Albertville, now called Kalemie, which is on Lake Tanganyika. Her registered length was 352.0 ft (107.3 m), her beam was 44.2 ft (13.5 m), her depth was 23.4 ft (7.1 m). As built, her tonnages were 3,953 GRT and 2,997 NRT.

Albertville had a single screw, driven by a three-cylinder triple expansion engine that was built by Thomas Richardson & Sons of West Hartlepool. It was rated at 419 NHP and gave her a speed of 12 knots (22 km/h).

== Owners, operators and identification ==
CMBC registered Albertville in Antwerp. Her Belgian code letters were MBCH.

In 1898 the African Steamship Company, which was part of Elder, Dempster Lines, bought both Léopoldville and Albertville. The African Steamship Co traded between Britain and Nigeria, and renamed both ships with names from Nigeria. Léopoldville was renamed after the region of Biafra, and Albertville was renamed after the town of Jebba on the River Niger.

The African Steamship Co re-registered both ships in London. Jebba had the United Kingdom official number 109969 and code letters QGVN. By 1904, 6,000 cubic feet (170 m^{3}) of her hold space was refrigerated to carry perishable cargo.

== Loss ==
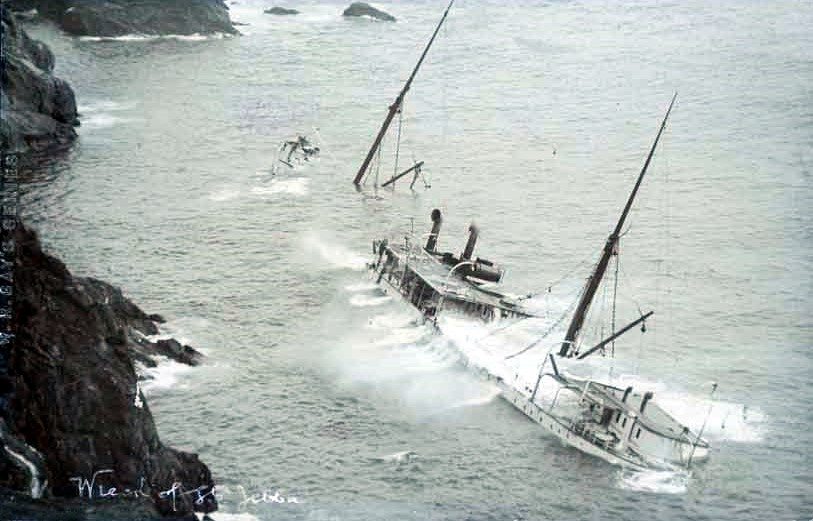
Jebba's wreck awash on Bolt Tail

In March 1907, Jebba was steaming from Calabar, Lagos, Gold Coast and Gran Canaria to Plymouth and Liverpool. She was carrying 79 passengers, many of whom were British troops being invalided home from being stationed in West Africa. She was also carrying mail, and a cargo that included rubber, palm oil, palm kernels, coffee, cocoa, fruit, and at least a small amount of ivory. In fog on the night of 18 March her crew overshot the Eddystone Lighthouse, and she struck rocks under the cliffs at Bolt Tail.

Jebba was the second liner to run aground in that part of the English Channel that night. A few hours earlier, the 12,500 GRT White Star Liner Suevic had run aground on Stag Rock, off Lizard Point, Cornwall, about 54 nautical miles (100 km) west of where Jebba had hit Bolt Tail.

Jebba's Master, Captain JJC Mills, RNR, ordered distress flares to be fired, and had the ship's furnaces extinguished to prevent a boiler explosion. The Hope Cove Life Boat soon reached Jebba, which was broadside on to the rocks at the foot of the cliff. But there was no room for the lifeboat to reach Jebba's leeward side, and it was unsafe to effect a rescue from her windward side.

Two local men, Isaac Jarvis and John Argeat (some sources say Argeant, others Argent), climbed down the 200-foot (61 m) cliffs. Accounts differ as to whether members of Jebba's crew fired a line ashore by means of a rocket, or Jarvis and Argeat threw a line to the ship, weighted with a rock on the end. Either way, a line was secured between ship and shore, and either a bosun's chair or a breeches buoy was attached to the line (again, accounts differ). By this means all 79 passengers and 76 crew were then safely winched ashore, one at a time. Once ashore, all 155 survivors were then helped to reach the top of the cliffs. Two HM Coastguard men and an HM Customs man worked with Jarvis and Argeat in the rescue. Also safely brought ashore were a chimpanzee, three monkeys, and numerous parrots.

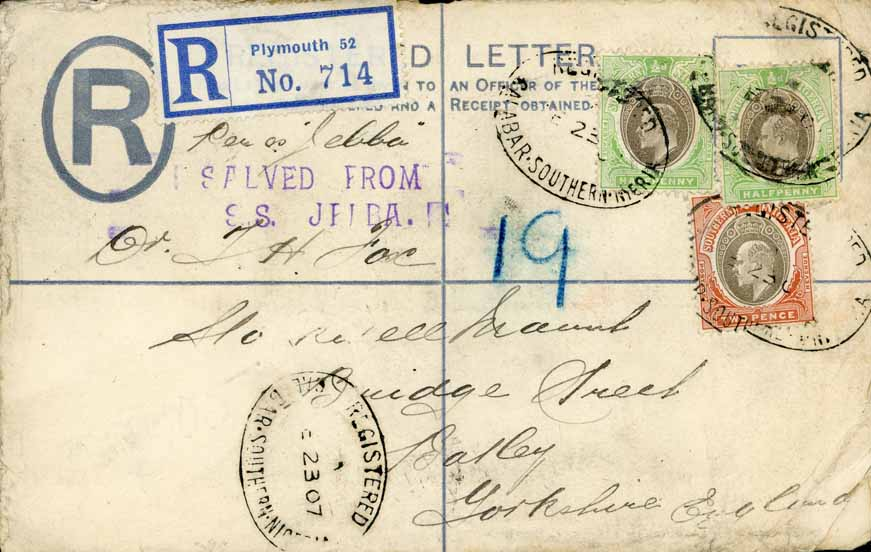
Registered envelope from Old Calabar, Nigeria, salvaged from Jebba

Jebba flooded soon after the rescue, but most of her mail and cargo was eventually salvaged, and so were such valuable components as could be safely removed. The General Post Office stamped the words "SALVED FROM SS JEBBA" in purple ink on each surviving item, before forwarding it to its addressee. These envelopes are now valued philatelic collector's items.

At Edward VII's personal behest, the Board of Trade awarded its Bronze Medal to five men: Jarvis and Argeat, plus HM Coastguard men Edwin Purslow and Robin Hayter, and HM Customs officer William Day. The Liverpool Shipwreck and Humane Society awarded Jarvis and Argeat its Silver Marine Medal. On 7 May 1907 a Board of Trade inquiry found Captain Mills at fault for the loss of his ship, and suspended his Master's certificate for six months.

== Wreck ==
The sea broke up those parts of Jebba's wreck that were not salvaged, but parts were still visible in the 2000s. Her bow, stern, rudder, one of her boilers, and some of the frame members of her hull could all be identified among the rocks. Recreational divers have visited the wreck, which is under less than 30 feet (9 m) of water. In 1971 a diver recovered from the wreck a dinner plate bearing the ship's original name Albertville.

== Bibliography ==
- Lloyd's Register of British and Foreign Shipping. Vol. I.–Steamers. London: Lloyd's Register. 1897 – via Internet Archive.
- Lloyd's Register of British and Foreign Shipping. Vol. I.–Steamers. London: Lloyd's Register. 1899 – via Internet Archive.
- "List of vessels fitted with refrigerating appliances". Lloyd's Register of British and Foreign Shipping. Vol. I.–Steamers. London: Lloyd's Register. 1904 – via Internet Archive.
- Mercantile Navy List. London. 1899 – via Crew List Index Project.
