= HMS Royal Katherine =

Ship of the line of the Royal Navy

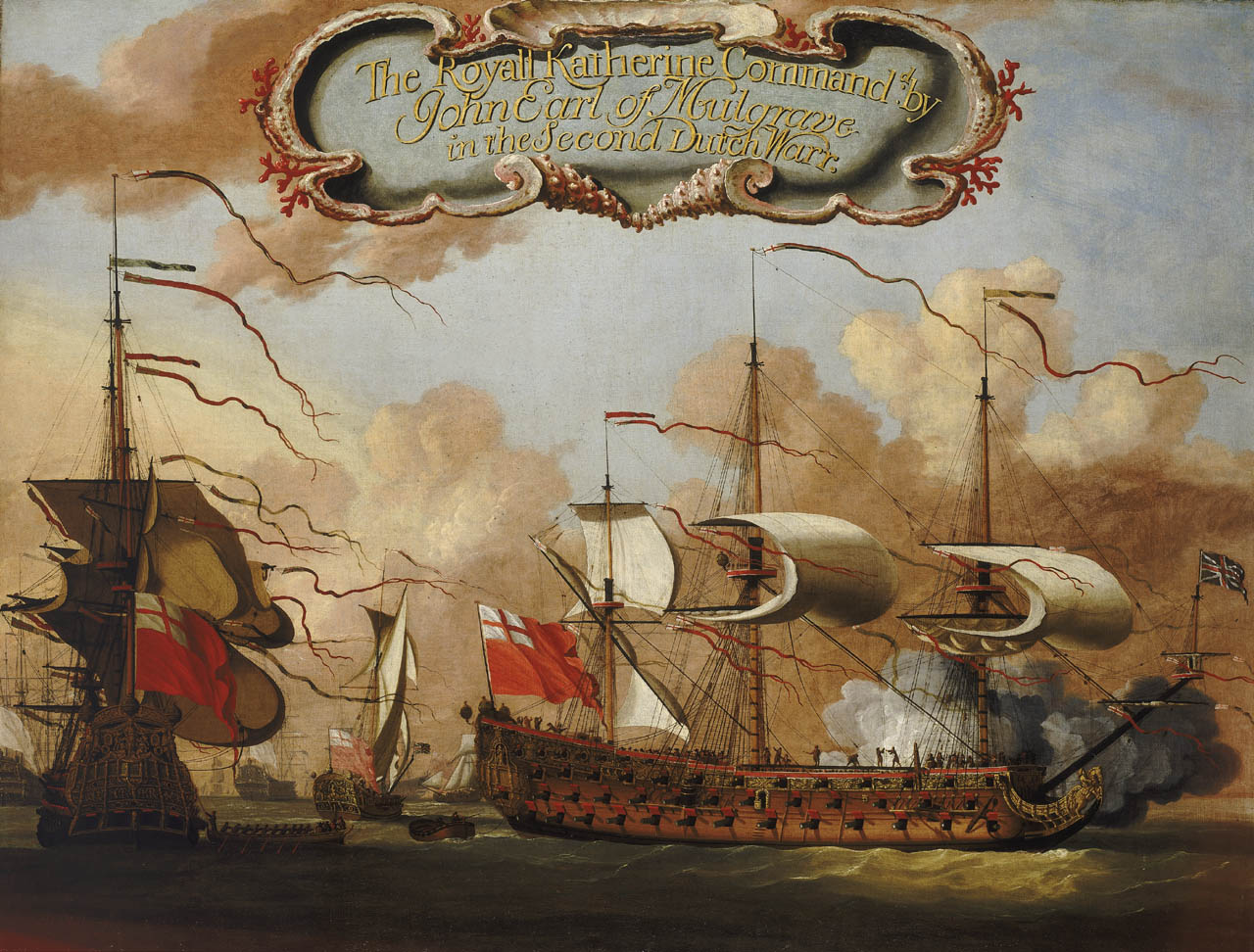
- HMS Royal Katherine, illustrated from a painting in 1664.

History

Great Britain
- Name: HMS Royal Katherine
- Ordered: October 1661
- Builder: Christopher Pett, Woolwich Dockyard
- Laid down: May 1662
- Launched: 26 October 1664
- Commissioned: 13 March 1665
- Renamed: HMS Ramillies, 1706
- Fate: Wrecked, 15 February 1760
- Notes: Participated in: Battle of Lowestoft; Four Days' Battle; St. James's Day Battle; Battle of Solebay; Battle of Schooneveld; Battle of Barfleur

General characteristics
- Class & type: 84-gun second rate ship of the line
- Tons burthen: 1037 75/94 bm
- Length: 121 ft (37 m) (keel)
- Beam: 40 ft (12 m)
- Draught: 20 ft 0 in (6.10 m)
- Depth of hold: 17 ft 2 in (5.23 m)
- Propulsion: Sails
- Sail plan: Full-rigged ship
- Armament: 84 guns of various weights of shot (86 guns by 1685)
- Notes: Rebuilt in 1702

General characteristics after 1702 rebuild
- Class & type: 90-gun second rate ship of the line
- Tons burthen: 1395 tons bm
- Length: 160 ft (49 m) (gundeck)
- Beam: 44 ft 6 in (13.56 m)
- Depth of hold: 18 ft 6 in (5.64 m)
- Propulsion: Sails
- Sail plan: Full-rigged ship
- Armament: 90 guns of various weights of shot
- Notes: Rebuilt, 1749

General characteristics after 1749 rebuild
- Class & type: 1741 proposals 90-gun second rate ship of the line
- Tons burthen: 1689 tons bm
- Length: 168 ft (51 m) (gundeck)
- Beam: 48 ft (15 m)
- Depth of hold: 20 ft 2 in (6.15 m)
- Propulsion: Sails
- Sail plan: Full-rigged ship
- Armament: 90 guns: Gundeck: 26 × 32 pdrs; Middle gundeck: 26 × 18 pdrs; Upper gundeck: 26 × 12 pdrs; Quarterdeck: 10 × 6 pdrs; Forecastle: 2 × 6 pdrs

HMS Royal Katherine (HMS Ramillies after 1706) was an 84-gun full-rigged second-rate ship of the line of the Royal Navy, launched in 1664 at Woolwich Dockyard. Her launching was conducted by Charles II and attended by Samuel Pepys. Royal Katherine fought in both the Second and Third Anglo-Dutch Wars and afterwards, the War of the Grand Alliance before entering the dockyard at Portsmouth for rebuilding in 1702. In this rebuilding, she was upgraded to carry more guns, 90 in total, and served in the War of the Spanish Succession during which she was renamed Ramillies in honour of John Churchill's victory at the Battle of Ramillies. She was rebuilt again in the 1740s before serving as the flagship of the ill-fated Admiral John Byng in the Seven Years' War. Ramillies was wrecked at Bolt Tail near Hope Cove on 15 February 1760.

== Launch ==
Royal Katherine was launched in 1664 by Charles II, an event attended by naval administrator Samuel Pepys. Pepys recorded the occasion in his diary and it was dramatised by BBC Radio 4 in 2012 as part of series 5 of The Diary of Samuel Pepys.

== Anglo-Dutch wars ==
Royal Katherine participated in the Second Anglo-Dutch War fighting in the Battle of Lowestoft on 13 June 1665, the Four Days' Battle from 11 June to 14 June 1666 and the St. James's Day Battle on 4 August 1666. She was scuttled in June 1667 to prevent her capture by the Dutch during the Raid on the Medway.

Refloated, Royal Katherine fought again during the Third Anglo-Dutch War of 1672–4. She was captured by the Dutch during the Battle of Solebay on 7 June 1672 but was retaken the same day. Royal Katherine was also part of the Anglo-French fleet for the Battle of Schooneveld. She saw action in the War of the Grand Alliance, fighting at the Battle of Barfleur on 29 May 1692.

== Rebuilds ==
Royal Katherine was rebuilt at Portsmouth in 1702 and became a 90-gun second rate.

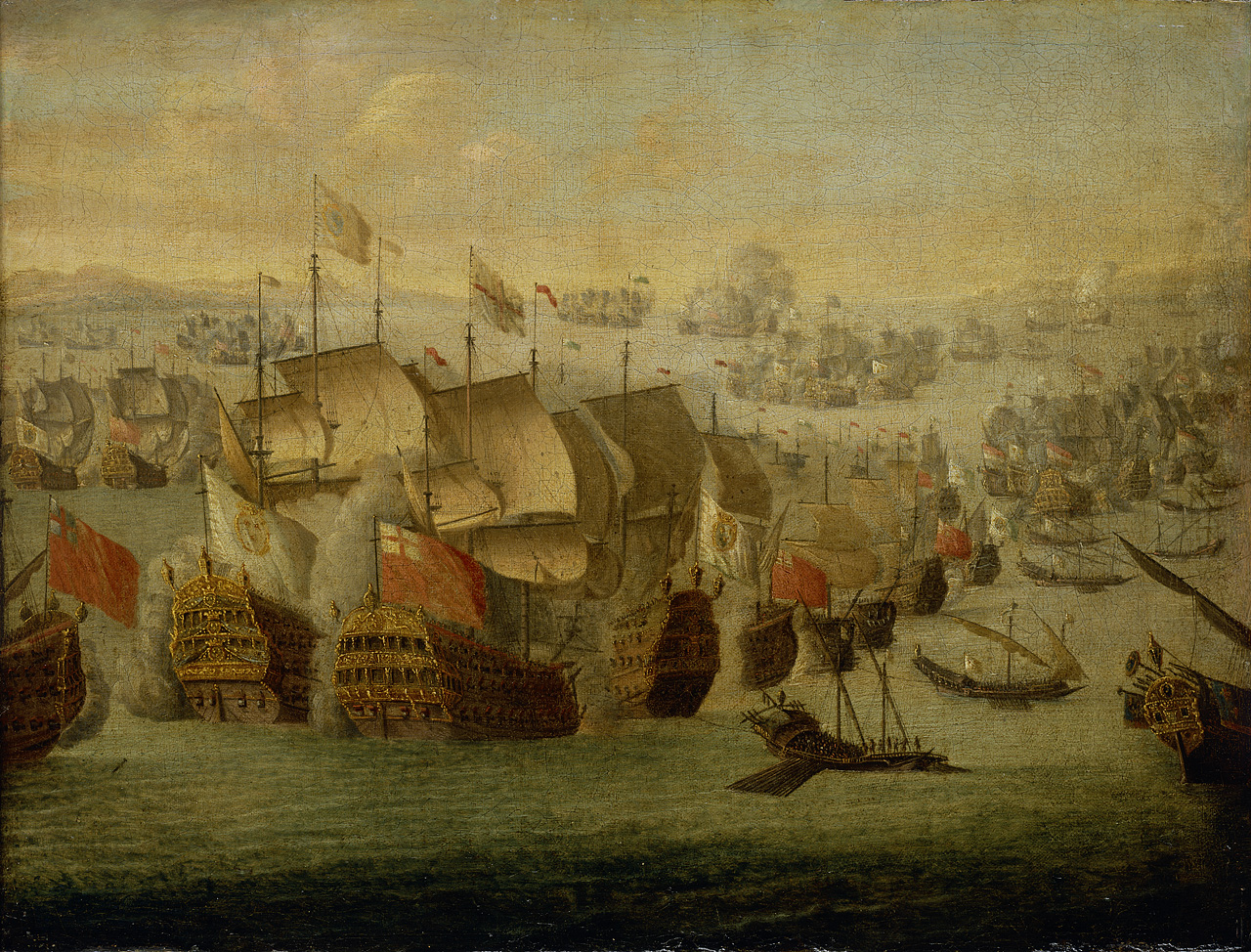
The Battle of Malaga, 13 August 1704. Foudroyant in starboard-quarter view, is closely engaged to starboard with the Royal Katherine

She served as the flagship of Admiral George Rooke in the War of the Spanish Succession from 1701.

Between 1 and 4 August 1704 Anglo-Dutch forces of the Grand Alliance under Prince George of Hesse-Darmstadt together with Admiral Sir George Rooke, flying his flag aboard HMS Royal Katherine, lead Royal Navy and Royal Marines units to capture Gibraltar.

In 1706 she was renamed Ramillies in honour of John Churchill's victory at the Battle of Ramillies fought that year. Ramillies was ordered to be rebuilt again at Portsmouth Dockyard in December 1744, along with Union and four smaller sloops, and after several years work was relaunched on 8 February 1749. She remained a 90-gun second rate in accordance with 1741 proposals of the 1719 Establishment.

She saw service in the Seven Years' War and was the flagship of Admiral John Byng when he failed to relieve Port Mahon and so lost the island of Minorca to the French. Byng was later controversially executed for this action.

== Wreck ==
Ramillies was wrecked at Bolt Tail near Hope Cove on 15 February 1760. The ship's master had mistaken their location as Ramillies approached the Devon shore, and the vessel was already within Hope Bay when the error was identified. There was a strong onshore wind and Ramillies' captain ordered the anchors lowered to hold the vessel fast until it could turn back to open sea, but no purchase could be found on the sandy seabed and the ship continued to drift towards the coast. After several hours she struck the cliffs beneath Bolt Tail and sank; twenty-six seamen and one midshipman survived from her crew of 850 men. The sinking became the subject of a popular contemporary folk song, "The Loss of the Ramillies", a version of which has been recorded by the English folk band Brass Monkey.
