= Churston Court =

Manor house in Devon, England

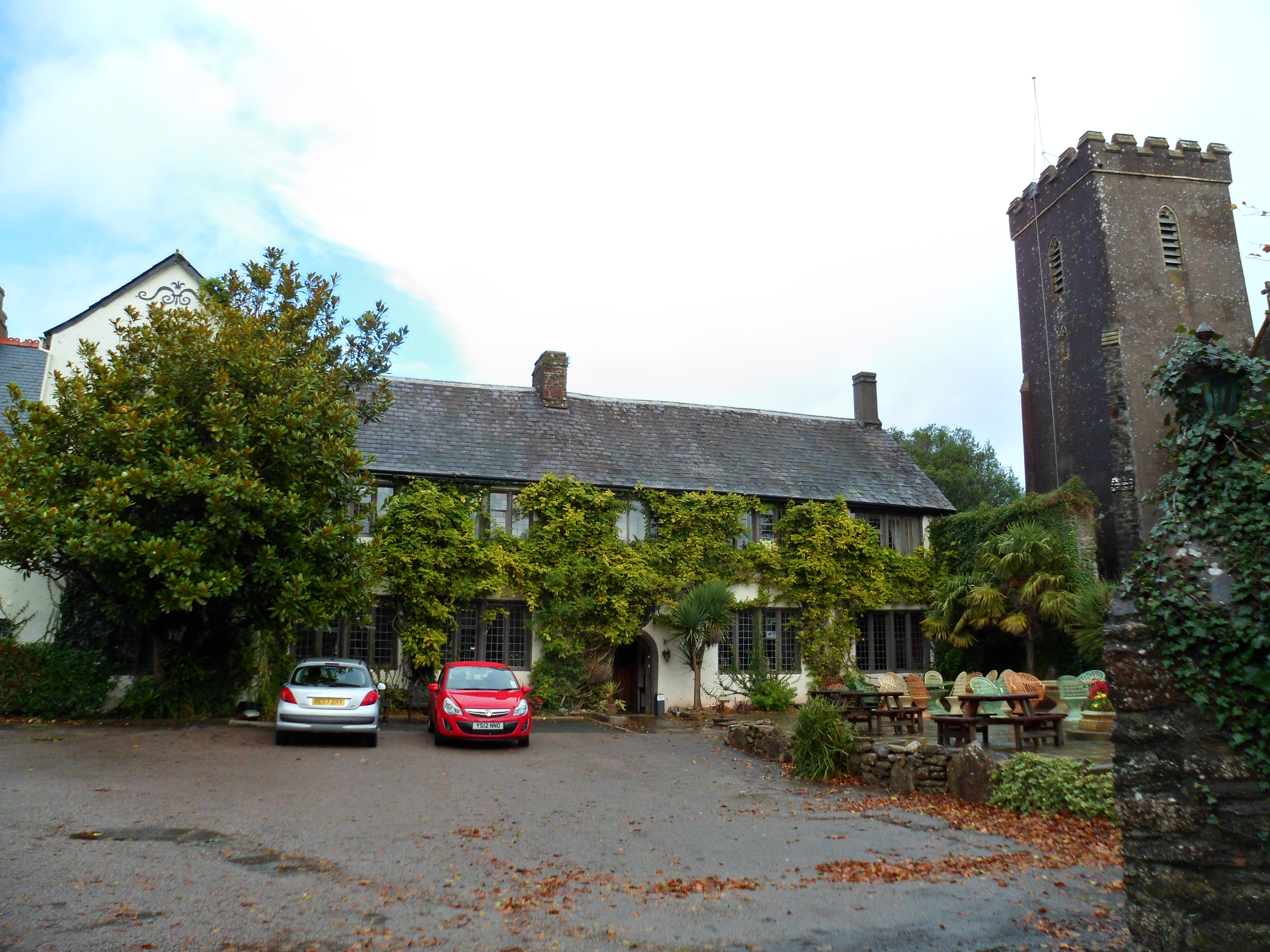
- Viewed from south-east, with St Mary the Virgin Church, parish church of Churston Ferrers, at right (east)

- Location within Devon
- Alternative names: Churston Manor

General information
- Location: Churston, Devon, England
- Coordinates: 50.3972°N 3.5433°W

Design and construction
- Designations: Grade II* Listed

Website
- churstoncourt.com

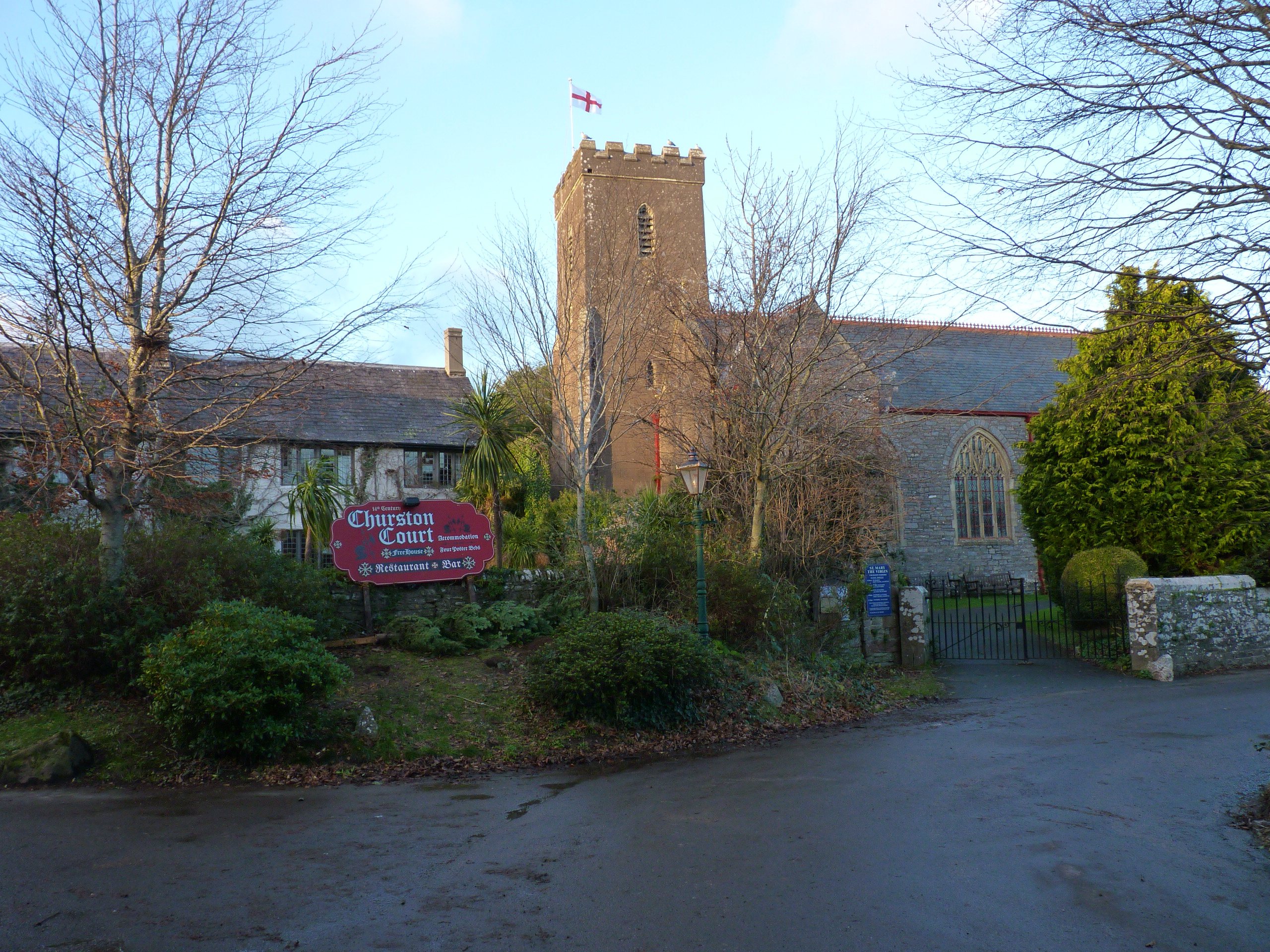
Churston Court and St Mary the Virgin Church, viewed from south

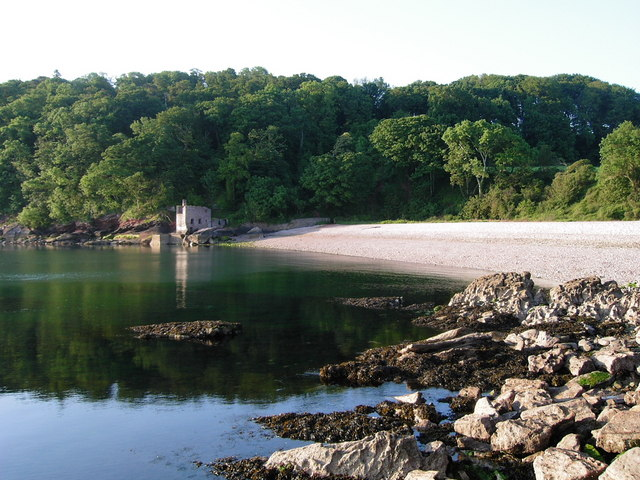
Elberry Cove, 1/2 mile north of Churston Court, with ruined private bathing house

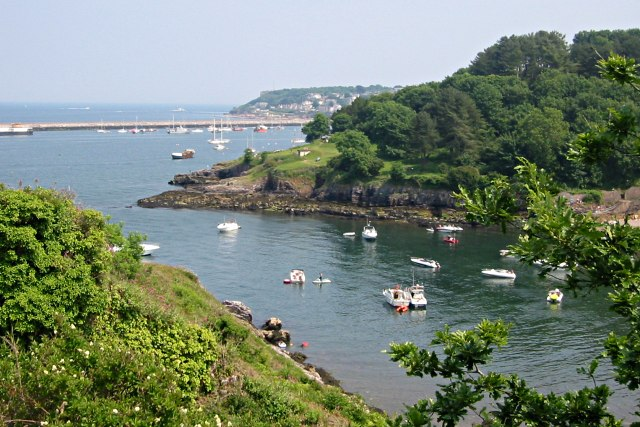
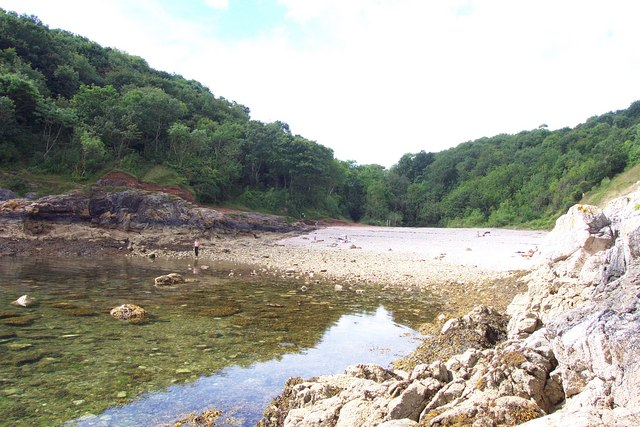
Churston Cove, 1/2 mile north of Churston Court

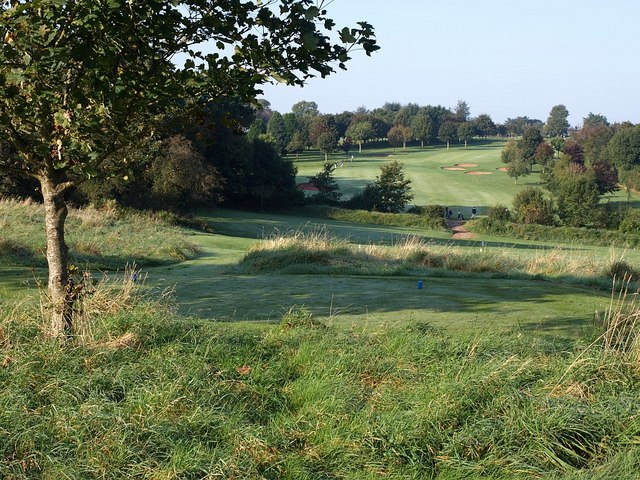
Churston Golf Course, on the land north of Churston Court extending to the coast

Churston Court is the manor house of the former manor of Churston Ferrers (anciently Cercetone (Domesday Book, 1086), Churecheton (Book of Fees, 13th c.), Churchstow, Churchton, Churchston, etc.), near Brixham in Devon and is a Grade II* listed building.

== Description ==
Today, the building serves as a hotel known as the Churston Court Inn. It is located immediately to the west of the parish church of Churston Ferrers, also next to the former home farm, and about 1/2 mile south of the coastline at Elberry Cove, which intervening ground now forms part of Churston Golf Course. It retains its original staircases, stone windows, oak panelling and flagstone floors. The hotel has 19 en-suite rooms with four-poster beds and is said to be haunted by the ghost of a monk who appears in the old kitchen. There is a smugglers tunnel linking the inn to Elberry Cove, which lies about half a mile away. There is also rumoured to be a link tunnel running over 10 miles to Berry Pomeroy from the inn. These tunnels were driven more than 400 years ago, so the quality and stability of the passages are no longer known. It is not known if the mine workings under Warborough Road, Churston contain any linking passages to the old smugglers' tunnel due to the Warborough adits being untraceable or backfilled under the overgrown thicket. In a recent planning application regarding works at number 2 Warborough Road, it is documented that one of the deep shafts is capped underneath the property's garden.

== History ==
Until 1967 the house was a seat of the Yarde family, later of their descendants the Yard-Buller family (in 1858 created Baron Churston) also seated at Lupton House, 1 mile due south in the same parish, a larger house. In 1850, when it was described as "lately...modernised (with)...tasteful grounds", John Yarde-Buller, 3rd Baronet (1799–1871) (after 1858 Baron Churston), whose paternal grandmother was Susanna Yarde (1740–1810), heiress of Churston, was using it as a residence for his eldest son, himself residing at the grander Lupton House.

Agatha Christie was a regular visitor when the property was owned by Lord Churston. She donated a stained glass window to the parish church and is believed to have been inspired to write her 1923 murder mystery novel The Murder on the Links, about a murder on a golf course in Northern France, whilst a guest at Churston Court. Lord Churston sold the property in 1967, having sold the major part of the Lupton and Churston estates in 1960. Churston Court was purchased by a local hotelier, the owner of the Grand Hotel in nearby Torquay. Lord Churston moved to Guernsey, thus severing his ties with Churston Ferrers.

Since its sale, various alterations have been made to the structure of the building, most notably an extension to the side and rear.
