= Malborough =

Village in Devon, England

Coordinates: 50.24°N 03.82°W

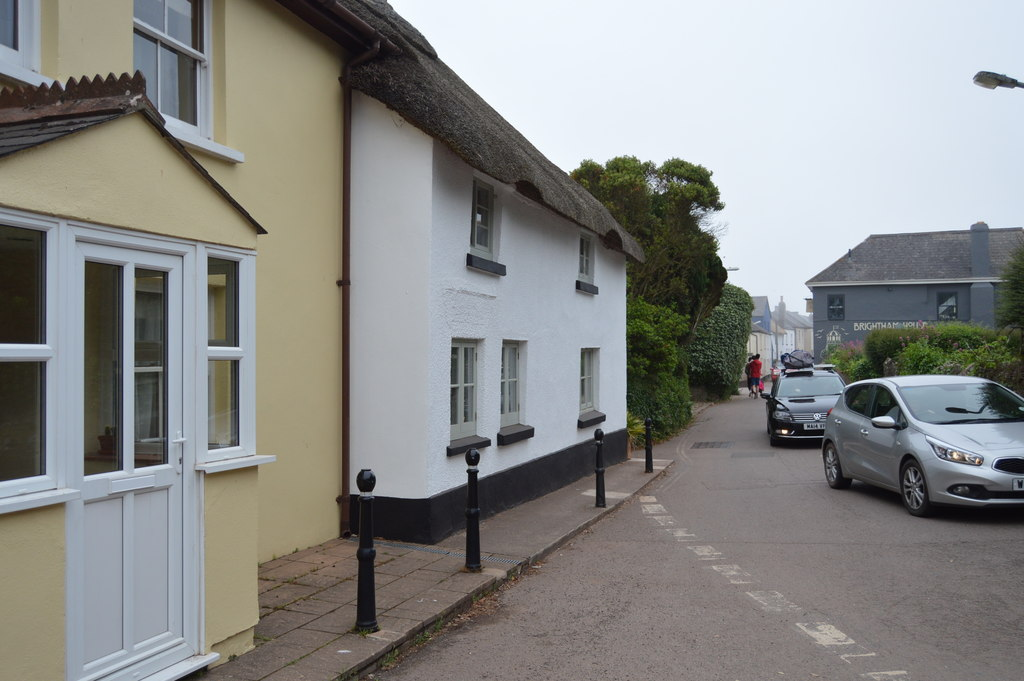
- Church Gate Cottage

- Location within Devon
- Population: 971 (2011)
- OS grid reference: SX6939
- Civil parish: Malborough
- District: South Hams
- Shire county: Devon
- Region: South West
- Country: England
- Sovereign state: United Kingdom
- Post town: KINGSBRIDGE
- Postcode district: TQ7
- Dialling code: 01548
- Police: Devon and Cornwall
- Fire: Devon and Somerset
- Ambulance: South Western
- UK Parliament: Totnes

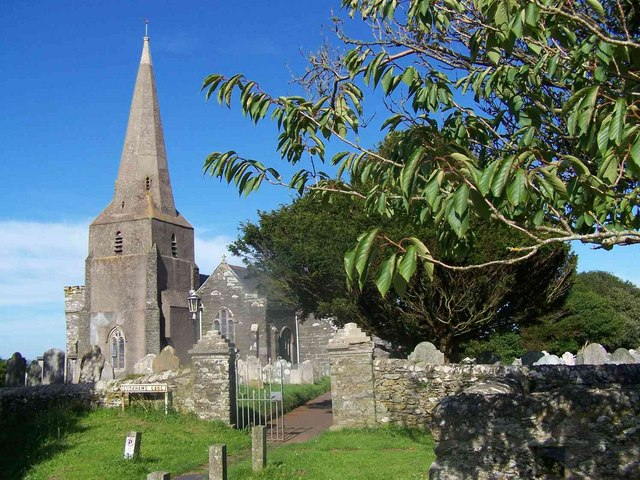
All Saints' Church, Malborough

Malborough is a village and civil parish in the South Hams region of Devon. The village is located on the A381 between Kingsbridge and Salcombe, and is a popular village for tourists, with many holiday homes located around the village. At the 2021 census, the parish had a population of 1,144, which was slightly more than the 971 recorded at the 2011 census.

Malborough can be seen from many miles away throughout the South Hams region, due to its magnificent church spire, which is located at the highest point of the village. The Church of All Saints dates from the 13th Century and is built from local Soar stone. The Right Honourable John Stapleton de Courcy, 28th Baron Kingsale, is interred in the churchyard, with other members of the de Courcy family.

The village is home to a small Asda supermarket and a petrol station. The village has an Anglican and a Baptist church (which runs coffee mornings), two pubs, a large village hall and playing fields with children's play equipment and an outdoor gym, a primary school, a post office, a thriving youthclub, and a football team.

== Historic estates ==
The parish of Malborough contains various historic estates including:

- Yarde, the original seat of the prominent Devonshire gentry family of Yard, of which branches were later seated at Teignwick, Kingsteignton; Bradley, Kingsteignton; Whiteway, Kingsteignton; Churston Ferrers; Sharpham, Ashprington. It was later a seat of the Dyer family.

== Moonraker ==
Malborough has a number of connections with the word "Moonraker": the village cricket club, a local taxi company and a house on the historic Lower Town are named Moonrakers. Legend has it that a consignment of brandy was landed at Hope Cove and was in the process of being brought across Bolberry Down to Malborough when the customs men were spied riding down the valley. The smugglers threw the barrels into Horsey Pool, but realised they could still be seen through the water in the moonlight, so started raking the surface of the pond. When the customs men asked what they were doing, they replied that they were trying to rake the moon out of the pond.

== War Aircrash 1944 ==
On 13 July, 1944, aircraft Liberator GR.Mk.V BZ 717 (L) of the 311 (Czech) Squadron Royal Air Force, took part in an anti-submarine patrol. The aircraft struck a hill while approaching Bold Head Airport, Devon on its return due to the thick fog. All nine of those on board were killed.
