= French ship Foudroyant (1693) =

Ship of the line of the French Navy

History

Kingdom of France
- Name: Foudroyant
- Builder: Blaise Pangalo, Brest Dockyard
- Laid down: April 1693
- Launched: 14 November 1693
- Completed: 1694
- Fate: Taken to pieces during 1714

General characteristics
- Tonnage: 2,200
- Length: 166 French feet (Note: The French foot (pre-metric) was 6.575% longer than the equivalent English foot.)
- Beam: 46 French feet
- Draught: 26 French feet
- Depth of hold: 21½ French feet
- Complement: 900, + 12/15 officers
- Armament: 104 guns

Foudroyant was a First Rank ship of the line of the French Royal Navy.

== History ==
The name means Thunderbolt, lightning; having an awesome and overwhelming effect. (Note: https://en.wiktionary.org/wiki/foudroyant Wiktionary)

This ship was originally ordered built at Brest Dockyard on 20 January 1693, and Louis XIV ordered she should bear the name Soleil Royal to replace the previous ship bearing that name (destroyed at Cherbourg) in June 1692. The designer and builder was Blaise Pangalo.

However, Étienne Hubac begged the King that that name should be given to the ship (Foudroyant) he had just build and was then completing instead, because the previous Soleil Royal had been built by his own father, Laurent Hubac, and - as he himself had rebuilt that ship from the keel up at Brest in 1689 - he still possessed the moulds for that ship. Moreover, he pointed out to the King that his own ship would be some 4 feet longer and some 200 tons larger than Pangalo's new ship, so would be more deserving of the name that honoured Louis XIV himself. On 1 March 1693, the King agreed to Hubac's proposal and the names of the two ships were exchanged. Pangalo's ship was thus laid down under the name Foudroyant in April 1693, launched on 14 November 1693 and completed in 1694.

She was armed with 104 guns, comprising twenty-eight 36-pounders on the lower deck, thirty 18-pounders on the middle deck, twenty-eight 12-pounders on the upper deck, twelve 6-pounders on the quarterdeck and six 6-pounders on the forecastle. In 1706 two extra 12-pounders were added on the upper deck, and two 6-pounders were removed.

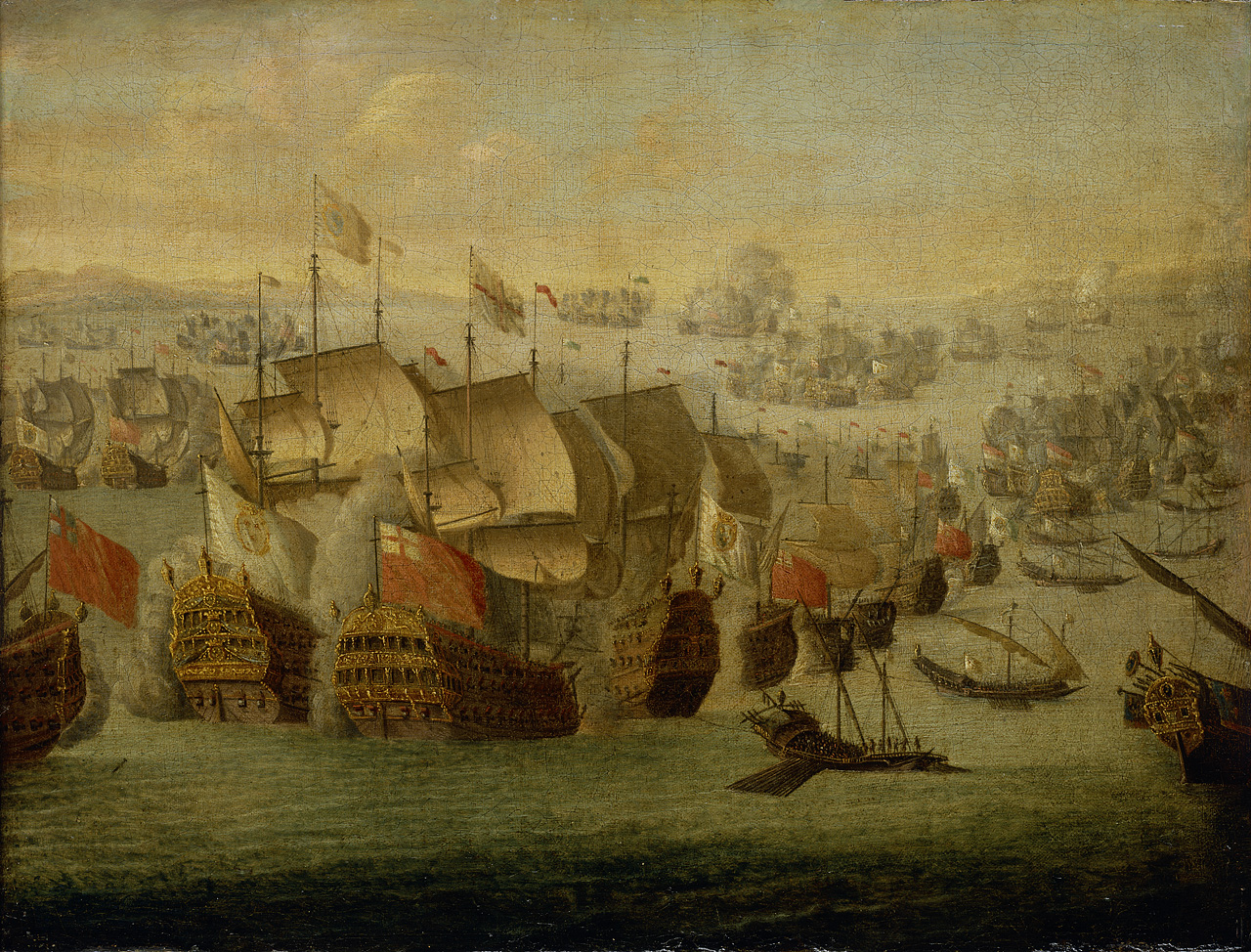
The Battle of Malaga, 13 August 1704. Foudroyant in starboard-quarter view, is closely engaged to starboard with Royal Katherine

The new ship took part in the Battle of Vélez-Málaga on 24 August 1704, where she was the flagship of Amiral de France Louis-Alexandre de Bourbon, Comte de Toulouse. She was scuttled in Toulon on Louis's orders in July 1707 to avoid being set alight by the bombardment by the English fleet. She was later put back afloat, but in March 1713 she was condemned, and was taken to pieces during 1714.
