= Fishcombe Cove =

Beach and cove in Devon, England

Elberry Cove
- Beach
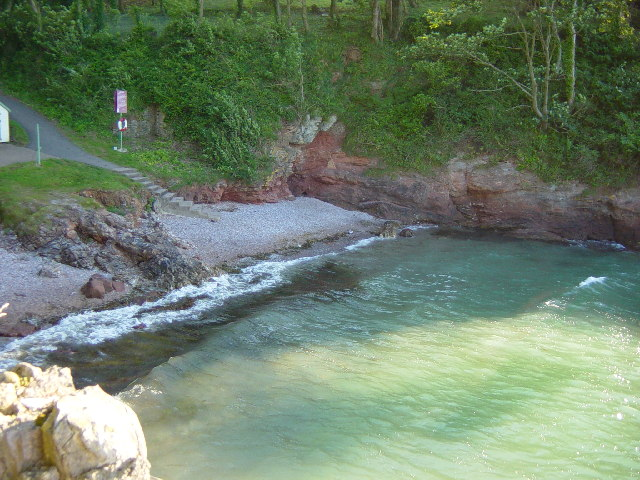
- Fishcombe Cove in 2004
- Interactive map of Elberry Cove
- Coordinates: 50.4022°N 3.5216°W
- Location: Devon, England
- Offshore water bodies: Fishcombe Cove, English Channel

Fishcombe Cove is a small shingle beach on the south-west coast of England, on the outskirts of Brixham. The beach is surrounded by woodland, and an entrance to Churston Woods is located above Fishcombe Cove. It is important for its eelgrass beds, breeding grounds for native seahorses. It is on the South West Coast Path.
