= Kapunda (ship) =

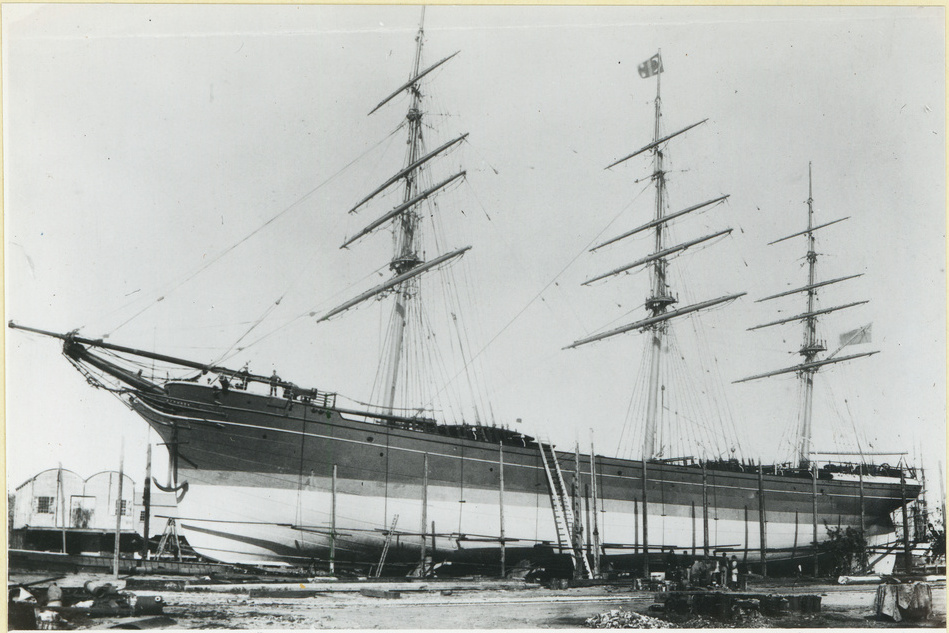
Kapunda, about 1880

Kapunda was a British emigrant ship which sank on 20 January 1887 after colliding with the barque Ada Melmoure in the Atlantic Ocean off the coast of Brazil. She was an iron-hulled ship of 1,095 tons, owned by Frinder, Anderson, and Company

Kapunda was in the Atlantic Ocean off Brazil heading from London to Fremantle, Western Australia, with a crew of 40, carrying 279 emigrants and general cargo, when at 3:20 a.m. on 20 January 1887 she collided with the 549-ton Ada Melmoure, which was bound from Coquimbo, Chile, to the United Kingdom with a cargo of manganese ore. Ada Melmoure hit Kapunda near the bow, and Kapunda sank so quickly that no lifeboats could be launched. Nine people managed to climb aboard Ada Melmoure, six others found a small boat in the water and boarded it, and Ada Melmoure lowered a boat that picked up one crew member. These 16 were the only survivors; the other 303 aboard Kapunda, including Captain John Masson, lost their lives in the disaster.

On 25 January 1887, 14 of Kapunda′s survivors transferred from Ada Melmoure to the French barque Ulysses, which took them to Bahia, Brazil. The other two survivors stayed with Ada Melmoure, landing at Maceió after Ada Melmoure also sank.

== Footnotes ==
According to a Royal Inquiry some months later in London, some of the Survivors spent a considerable amount of time in Shark infested waters prior to being saved after the Shipwreck clinging to anything that would float. Also according to that inquiry, some were killed by Sharks while in the water; per William Norman's (survivor) Great Grandson, footnote author.
