= Bolt Head =

Headland on the south coast of Devon, England

Coordinates: 50°12′40″N 3°47′16″W

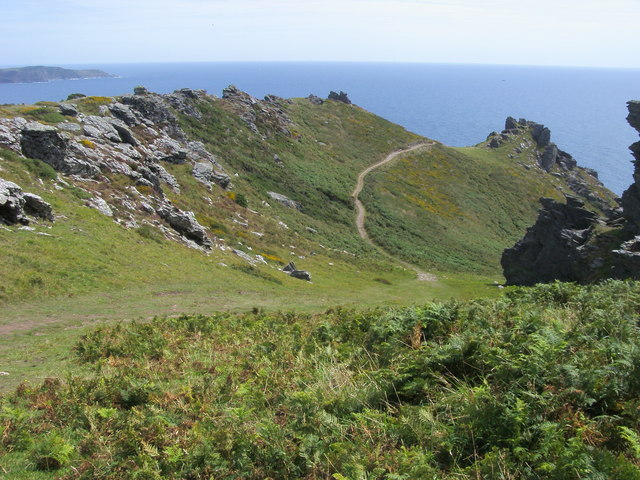
The footpath to Bolt Head

Bolt Head is a National Trust headland on the South Coast of Devon, England, United Kingdom, situated west of the Kingsbridge Estuary. It is a popular viewpoint on the South West Coast Path between Hope Cove, Bolt Tail, Bolberry Down and Salcombe.

== See also ==
- RAF Bolt Head
- Bolt Tail
