= Battisborough Cross =

Hamlet in Devon, England

- Hamlet
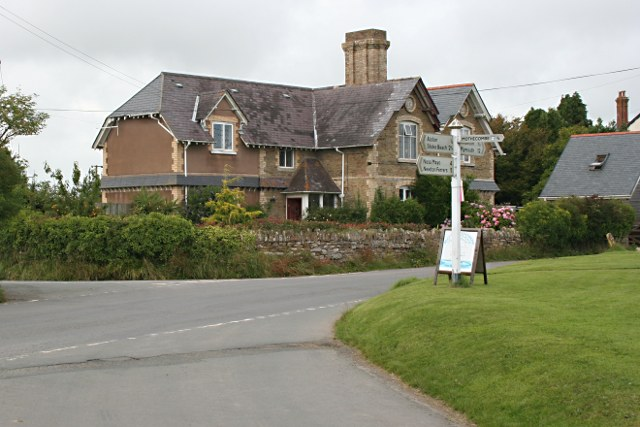
- The Crossroads at Battisborough Cross

- Location in Devon
- Coordinates: 50°19′06″N 3°58′09″W
- Country: United Kingdom
- Region: South West England
- County: Devon
- Postcode District: PL8

Battisborough Cross is a village in the parish of Holbeton near Plymouth on the south coast of Devon, England. It is within the South Devon Area of Outstanding Natural Beauty.
