= Churston Cove =

Cove in Devon, England

Coordinates: 50.4029°N 3.5239°W

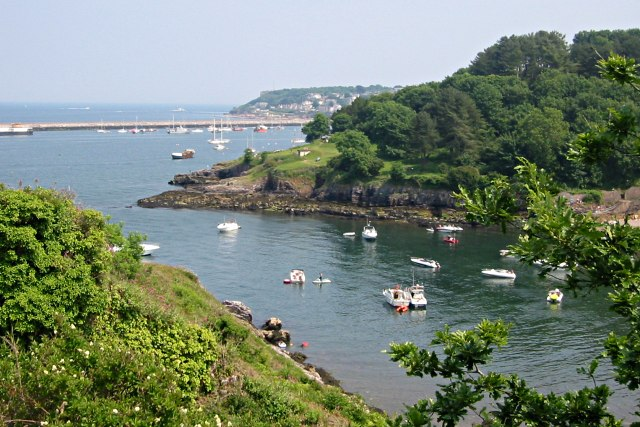
Churston Cove seen from Fishcombe Point in 2003.

Churston Cove is a cove with a sand and shingle beach on the outskirts of Brixham, surrounded by cliffs and wooded hillsides. An entrance to Churston Woods is located at the back of the cove. There is a steep path leading down to the beach which also passes through Churston Woods. It is on the South West Coast Path.
