= Hope Cove Life Boat =

Lifeboat station in Devon, England

The Hope Cove Life Boat
- Location within Devon

General information
- Type: Lifeboat station
- Location: Inner Hope, TQ7 3HW, United Kingdom
- Coordinates: 50.2417°N 3.8577°W
- Opened: 1992
- Owner: Hope Cove Life Boat

Website
- Hope Cove Life Boat

Hope Cove Life Boat, at Hope Cove in Devon, is a voluntary search and rescue service that operates an inshore rescue boat in the Bigbury Bay area. The Royal National Lifeboat Institution (RNLI) had a lifeboat station at Hope Cove from 1878 until 1930 which is now a listed building.

== RNLI Hope Cove Lifeboat Station ==
The RNLI established a lifeboat station at Hope Cove in 1878 provided by The Freemasons of England. The land for the boat house was donated by the Earl of Devon. Replacement boats were supplied in 1887, 1900 and 1903 and all four lifeboats were named Alexandra.

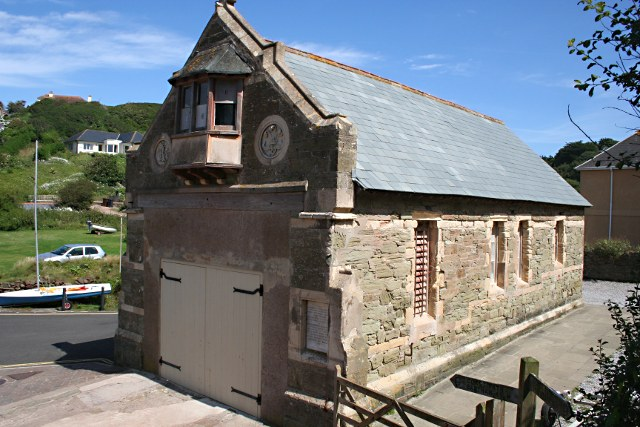
The former RNLI boathouse

The station was closed in April 1930 by which time the neighbouring station at Salcombe had been equipped with a motor lifeboat which could cover Bigbury Bay.

The old RNLI boathouse (located at 50.2421°N 3.85937°W) has been designated as a Grade II listed building.

== Independent service ==
A rescue boat was based in Inner Hope in 1992. It was crewed by volunteers under the management of the Maritime and Coastguard Agency (MCA) as part of the Cliff Rescue Team (CRT). In 2010 the MCA decided it would no longer maintain any rescue boats in the UK.

The Under Secretary for Transport recognised the ongoing need for this sea rescue facility in Bigbury Bay and gave the village the opportunity to run an independent lifeboat. A public meeting was held in the village and unanimous support given to form a limited company and registered charity to achieve this. The Hope Cove Life Boat became the 63rd Independent lifeboat service in the UK and has since worked with the MCA and the RNLI to continue to meet their goal of protecting and preserving life in Bigbury Bay. It is a company limited by guarantee, number 07456004, and registered charity number 1140126.

The 6.5 m (21 ft) Rigid-hulled inflatable boat (RIB) Alexandra built by Ribcraft of Yeovil. It has been in service since 2013 and had a major refit in 2022.

== See also ==
- Independent lifeboats in Britain and Ireland
- List of RNLI stations
- List of former RNLI stations
