= South Devon National Landscape =

Protected area in UK

- IUCN category V (protected landscape/seascape)
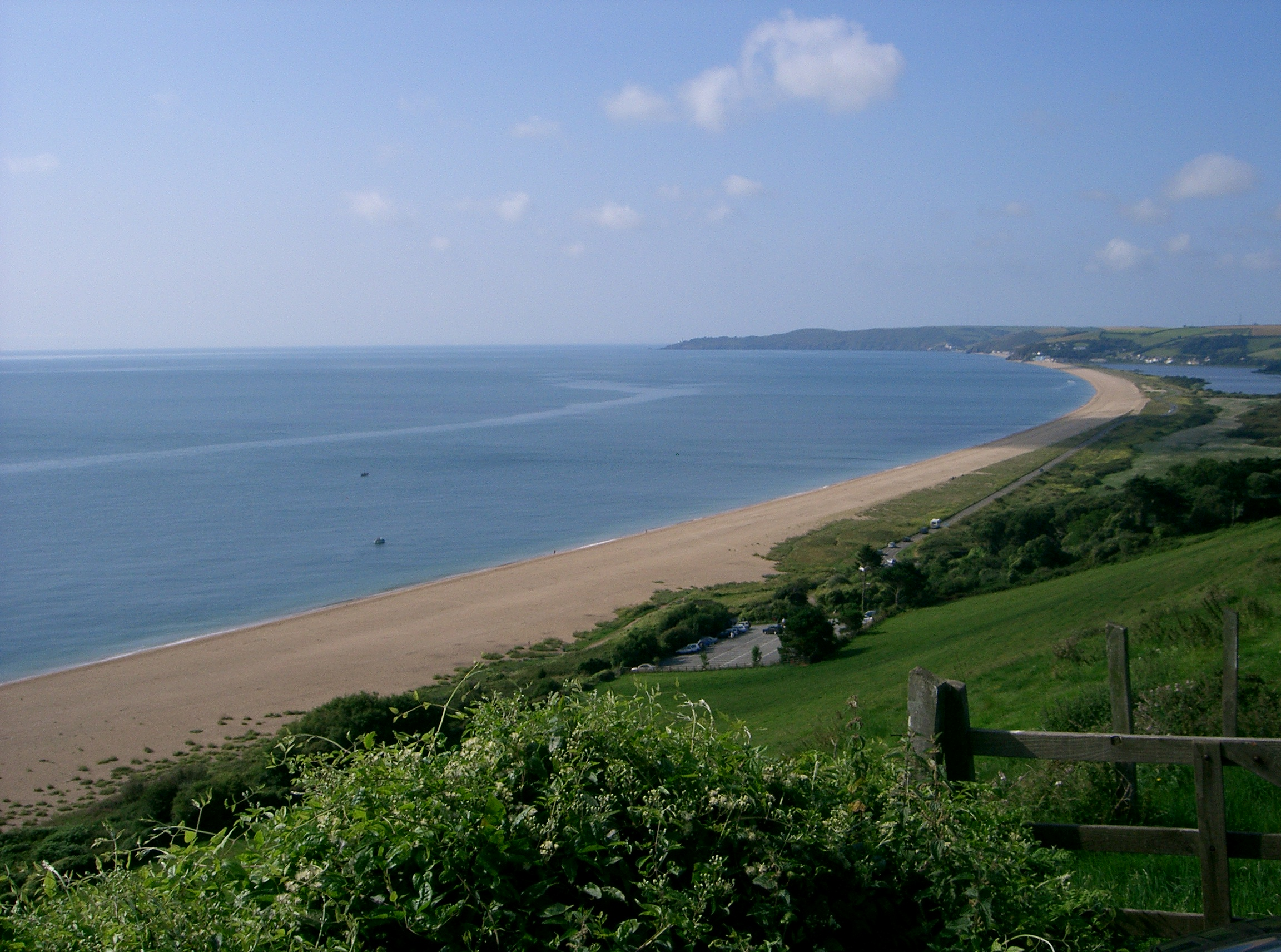
- Slapton Sands in the South Devon AONB
- Interactive map of South Devon National Landscape
- Location: Devon, England
- Coordinates: 50.314°N 3.825°W
- Established: confirmed August 1960
- Website: www.southdevonaonb.org.uk

The South Devon National Landscape covers 337 square kilometres, including much of the South Hams area of Devon and the rugged coastline from Jennycliff Bay to Elberry Cove near Brixham. The purpose of an Area of Outstanding Natural Beauty is to conserve and enhance the area's natural beauty. In South Devon this includes: undeveloped coastline, estuaries, geological and geomorphological features, expansive panoramic views, ancient agricultural field pattern, Devon banks, areas of high tranquility, dark night skies and natural nightscapes, historic features, green lanes, well known cultural associations, picturesque villages and hamlets. South Devon AONB was formally designated in August 1960 under the National Parks and Access to the Countryside Act 1949 (South Devon AONB Management Plan 2009-14). The highest point in the AONB is Blackdown Camp at 199 metres above sea level.

Towns and villages within the area include Bigbury/Burgh Island, Kingsbridge, Newton Ferrers, Battisborough Cross, Salcombe on the Kingsbridge Estuary, Slapton, Wembury, and Dartmouth and Kingswear on either side of the River Dart Estuary.

The AONB also includes several Sites of Special Scientific Interest, including two national nature reserves and four Special Areas of Conservation. It contains nationally important populations of greater horseshoe bat, cirl bunting, shore dock and great green bush cricket.

The AONB also includes a 97km section of the South West Coast Path, 10 kilometres of cliffs at Bolt Head, Bolberry Down which is one of the longest stretches of coast belonging to the National Trust and Prawle Point, the southernmost point in Devon.
