= Bolt Tail =

Headland on the south coast of Devon, England

Coordinates: 50.2423°N 3.8666°W

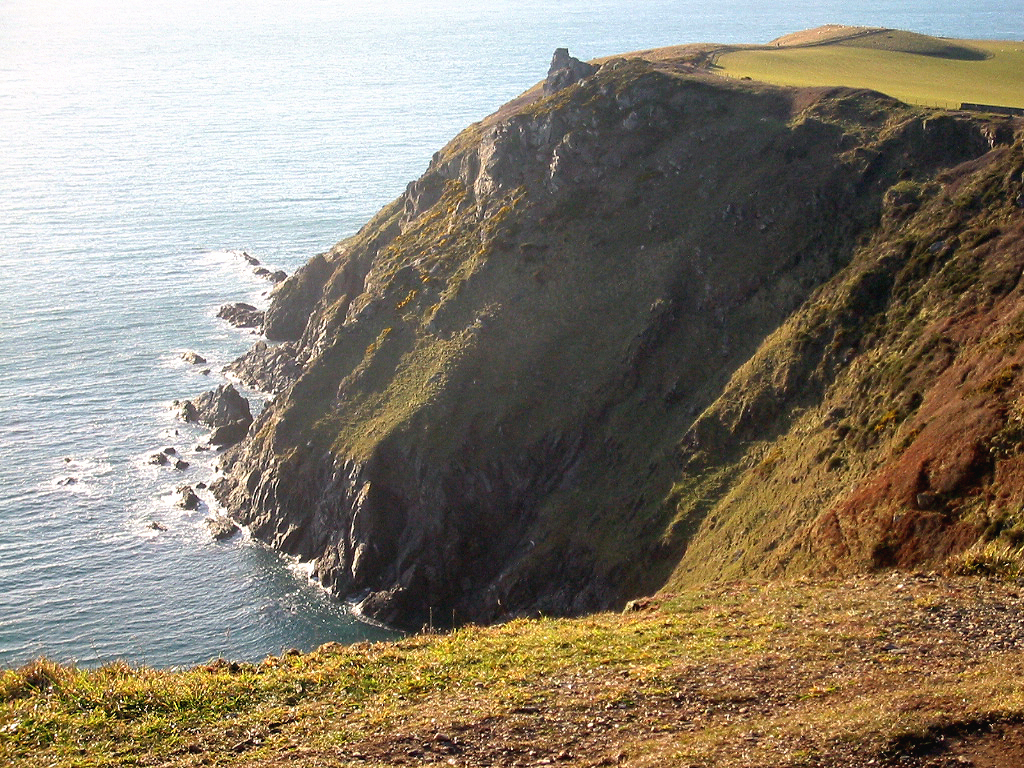
Bolt Tail

Bolt Tail is a headland in Devon, England, immediately to the southwest of Hope Cove in the South Hams district, at grid reference SX670397.

Bolt Tail is the site of an Iron Age promontory fort, although little evidence now remains of this structure; it occupied a classic promontory defended from inland by a linear earthwork at some 60 metres above sea level.

Bolt Tail marks the western end of a coastal walk through National Trust land to Salcombe, via Bolberry Down and Bolt Head at the mouth of the Salcombe Estuary. It offers views to Bantham Beach and Burgh Island. On a day with good visibility it is possible to see far down the coast into Cornwall, as far as Dodman Point. Under very exceptional atmospheric conditions the Lizard Point in Cornwall is visible from Bolt Tail.

The SS Jebba ran aground near here in 1907.

Nearby, a similar fate had befallen the 90-gun ship-of-the-line HMS Ramillies in February 1760.
