= Bolberry Down =

Clifftop area on the coast of south Devon, England

Coordinates: 50.231694°N 3.843282°W

The location of Bolberry Down within Devon
(grid reference SX685385)

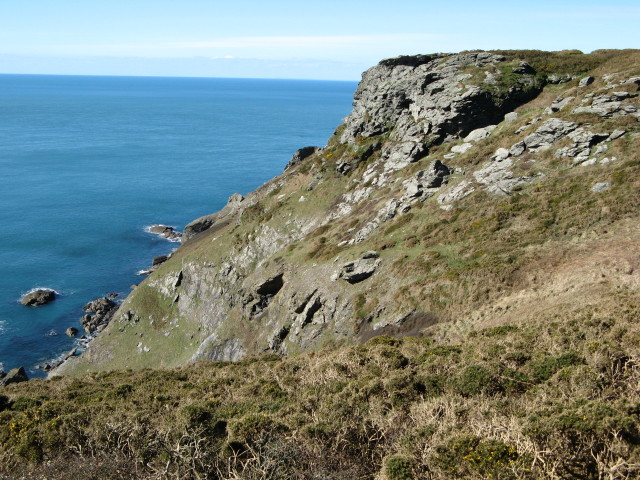
Cliff at Bolberry Down, Bolberry

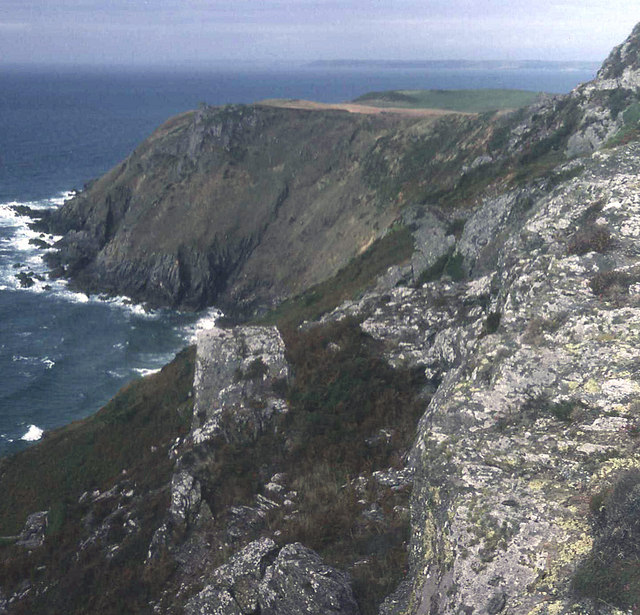
Cliffs west of Slippery Point

Bolberry Down is a clifftop area on the coast of Devon, England. The headland of Bolt Tail lies to the west and Bolt Head and the town of Salcombe to the east. It is one of the longest coastal areas owned by the National Trust and lies within the South Devon Area of Outstanding Natural Beauty. Parts of Bolberry Down are situated within the Site of Special Scientific Interest called Bolt Head to Bolt Tail.

The down provides views across the English Channel.

Bolberry Down was the site of a Decca Navigator station in the SOUTH WEST BRITISH 1B chain which operated from 1952 until 31 March 2000, covering the south-west approaches. The visible sign of this system were three 150ft tubular masts and these were located to the east of the access road to Bolberry Down, together with the former bungalows for the staff. One mast remains in use today for other purposes.
