= Galmpton, South Hams =

Hamlet in Devon, England

Coordinates: 50.249°N 3.836°W

Galmpton
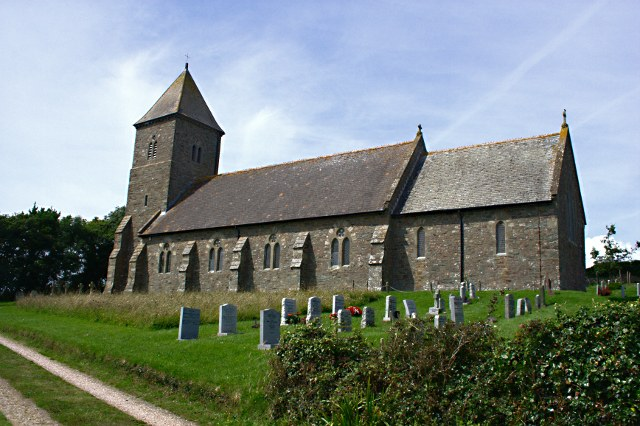
- Holy Trinity Church

- Location within Devon
- Civil parish: South Huish
- District: South Hams
- Shire county: Devon
- Region: South West
- Country: England
- Sovereign state: United Kingdom

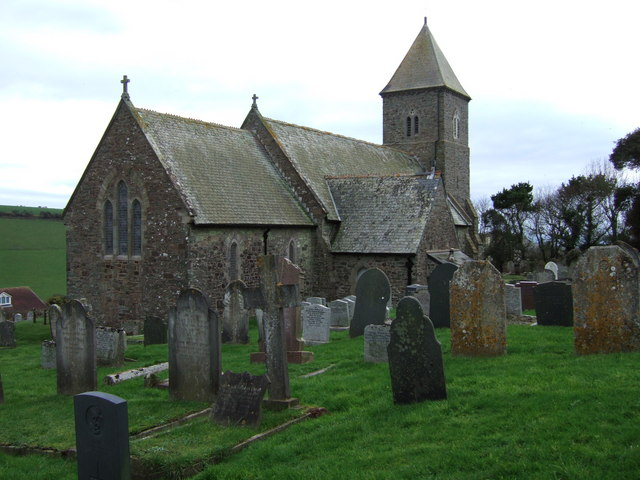
Holy Trinity Church

Galmpton is a small hamlet in the civil parish of South Huish, in the South Hams district, in Devon, England, near Thurlestone. It is 5 miles west of Salcombe. In 1870-72 Galmpton had a population of 176 as recorded in the Imperial Gazetteer of England and Wales. Galmpton was recorded in the Domesday Book as Walementone/Walenimtona
