= Hope Cove =

Village in Devon, England

Coordinates: 50°14′45″N 3°51′29″W

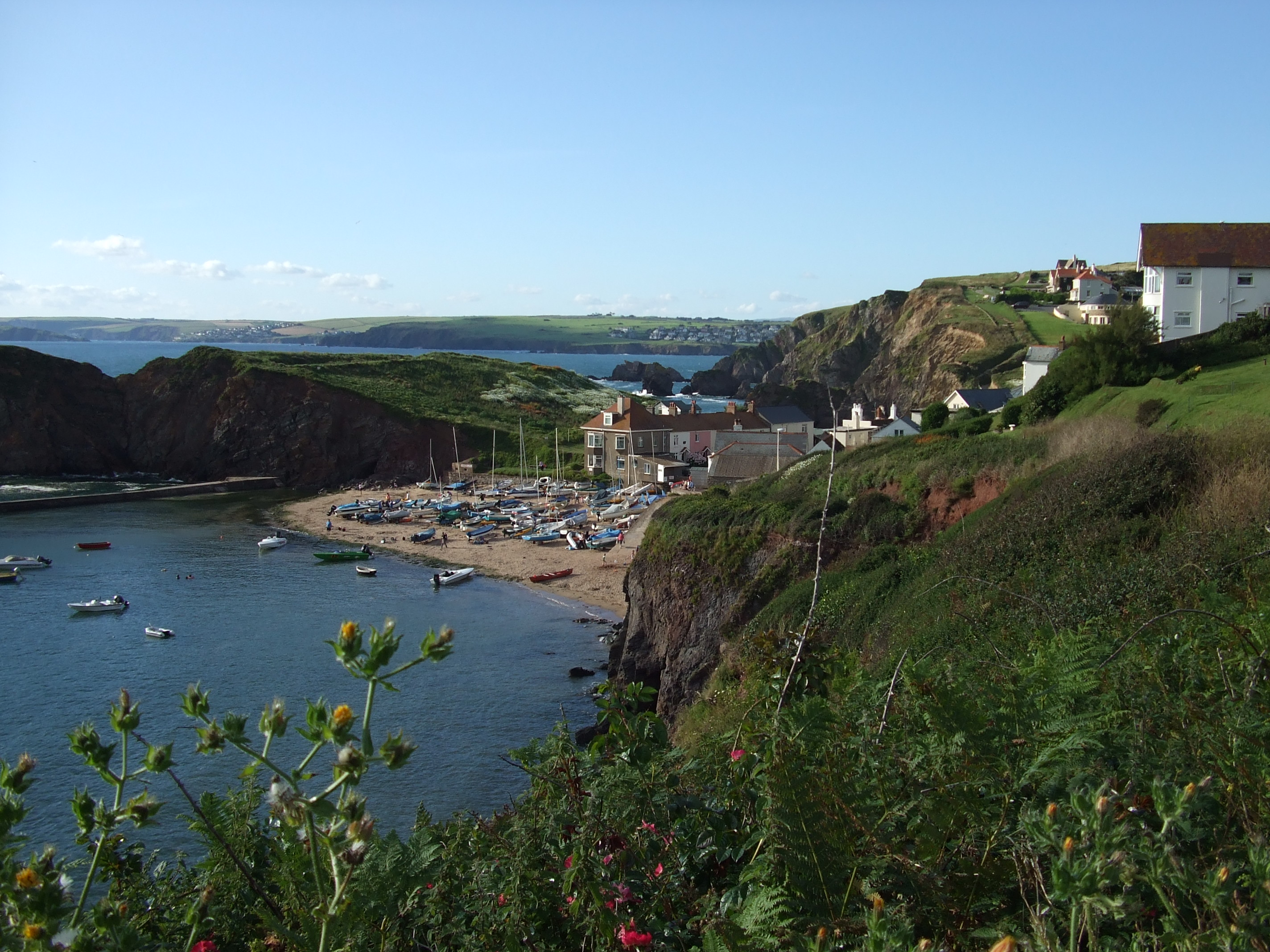

- Location within Devon
- OS grid reference: SX676402
- Civil parish: South Huish
- District: South Hams
- Shire county: Devon
- Region: South West
- Country: England
- Sovereign state: United Kingdom
- Post town: KINGSBRIDGE
- Postcode district: TQ7
- Dialling code: 01548
- Police: Devon and Cornwall
- Fire: Devon and Somerset
- Ambulance: South Western
- UK Parliament: Totnes

Hope Cove is a small seaside village within the civil parish of South Huish in South Hams district, Devon, England. It is located 5 miles (8 km) west of Salcombe and 5 miles (8 km) south west of Kingsbridge. It has two beaches, and is sheltered by the headland of Bolt Tail.

== History ==
The name Hope Cove may derive tautologically from the Old Norse word hóp meaning "bay" or "small inlet".

Historically, the village falls into two parts, Outer Hope to the north and Inner Hope to the south. Inner Hope fell within the parish of Malborough until 1974, when it was united with its neighbour on the other side of a small headland. Both parts of the village originally developed as a centre for the local fishing industry. Hope Cove also developed a reputation for smuggling and for plundering wrecked ships.

In 1588 the ships of the Spanish Armada passed the village as they moved up the English Channel. After the Armada was defeated and headed back through storms, the San Pedro el Mayor, a transport ship fitted out as a hospital, was blown onto the rocks between Inner and Outer Hope. The 140 survivors were initially sentenced to death, but were eventually ransomed and sent back to Spain.

Hope Cove was the setting for a number of studies by Victorian painter Sir Luke Fildes; inspiring the cottage in his work in oil The Doctor.

Early in World War II, 'RAF Hope Cove' was established as a GCI Mobile Radar Station at Soar Farm near Malborough and in 1941 RAF Bolt Head opened as a fighter satellite airfield on adjacent land with RAF Exeter as its parent station. Many RAF personnel were billeted in Hope Cove including The Cottage Hotel and The Grand Hotel. Both bases were closed soon after the war ended in 1945 but RAF Hope Cove reopened and was expanded to accommodate an 18,000 sq ft underground R6 ROTOR bunker to meet the growing Soviet threat to peace in the early 1950s. An RAF Married Quarters site was built in Malborough (its houses survive today in private ownership as Malborough Park) but the ROTOR site was only operational from 1956–58 and was finally sold off by the government in 1999.

The village featured in the British comedy film The Supergrass, with location filming in and around Hope Cove in late 1984. Directed by Peter Richardson and starring Adrian Edmondson, Jennifer Saunders, Dawn French and others from the 1980s alternative comedy group 'The Comic Strip', The Supergrass was their first feature-length film. It was released in the UK in November 1985.

== Lifeboat ==
The Royal National Lifeboat Institution established a lifeboat station at Hope Cove in 1878 on land donated by the Earl of Devon. Four boats, all named Alexandra, were supplied in 1887, 1900 and 1903. The station was closed in April 1930 by which time the neighbouring station at Salcombe had been equipped with a motor lifeboat which could cover Bigbury Bay.

In 1992 the service was re-established under the management of the Maritime and Coastguard Agency (MCA) as part of the Cliff Rescue Team (CRT), the MCA withdrew support and funding for the boat in 2010. The Hope Cove Life Boat was then established as an Independent Life Boat with the support of the village and a registered charity was established to run and maintain the service. A new boat "Alexandra" was launched at Easter in 2013 paid for with funds raised from the village and visitors. The charity is run by volunteers and the boat is also crewed by volunteers who train and respond in their own time. More details can be found here www.hopecovelifeboat.org

== Modern era ==
The village is now mainly devoted to tourism and the area lies within the South Devon Area of Outstanding Natural Beauty.

2015 saw the broadcast of the first series of a new BBC TV daytime drama called The Coroner, starring Claire Goose and Matt Bardock with The House on the Beach. A second series followed in 2016, making a total of 20 episodes although there are no plans for any further series.

The Cove Café Bar was named the UK's Best Independent Craft Beer Bar (rural) in 2018.

== Bibliography ==
Collyer, Graham, editor (2005) 'Hope Cove, Galmpton and South Huish - The Story of a Devon Parish' (Hope Archive Group, ISBN 1 871330 68 8)
