= Manor of North Molton =

Historic manor in Devon, England

Arms of Alan la Zouche, 1st Baron la Zouche of Ashby (1267–1314) as shown on his seal affixed to the Barons' Letter, 1301: Gules, ten bezants 4, 3, 2, 1. The arms of la Zouche are blazoned in various 13th- and 14th-century rolls of arms including the Falkirk Roll, the Caerlaverock Poem, Glover's Roll, & The Camden Roll as Gules, bezantée, i.e. with an unquantified scattering of bezants

North Molton is an historic manor in Devon, England.

== Descent of the manor ==
=== La Zouche ===
North Molton was a manor within the royal demesne (known as Nortmoltone in 1086) until it was granted to a member of the la Zouche family by King John (1199–1216). In 1270 Roger la Zouche was granted licence to hold a weekly market in the manor and an annual fair on All Saints' Day. Alan la Zouche, 1st Baron la Zouche of Ashby (1267–1314), son of Roger de la Zouche, was born in North Molton on St Denis's Day (9 October) 1267 and was baptised in the church there, as was testified by his uncle "Henry la Zuche, clerk" at his proof of age inquisition in 1289. In 1313 he donated the advowson of the church to Lilleshall Abbey in Shropshire, which retained it until the dissolution of the monasteries in the 16th century. The family's mansion-house was at Burcombe, the castellated remains of which were still visible in about 1750. The site, which is today Burcombe Farm, is 1 1/4 miles SW of the church on the ridge road leading to South Molton.

=== St. Maur ===
Arms of St Maur of North Molton: Argent, two chevronels gules a label of three points vert

Arms of Seymour of Hatch Beauchamp: Gules, two wings conjoined in lure or

A member of the family of St Maur (or "Seymour") married a co-heiress of la Zouche, and thereby acquired the manor of North Molton. The Devon historian Tristram Risdon (d.1640) gives the arms of "Nicolas, Lord St. Maur, of Northmolton" and of "Richard, Lord St. Maur, sonne of Nicolas" as: Argent, two chevronels gules a label of three points vert.

A surviving deed dated 1377 is summarised as follows:

Richard Seymour, knight, to settle the manor of North Molton and the advowsons of the churches there and at Black Torrington on himself, Ela his wife, the heirs male of their bodies, William Brightle, and Guy Mone, clerk, with remainder to his own right heirs.

In 1503 North Molton was held by Sir William Seymour, the 4th son of John Seymour (died 1491), feudal baron of Hatch Beauchamp in Somerset, grandfather of Queen Jane Seymour. Sir William Seymour was made a Knight of the Bath at the marriage of Prince Arthur to Catherine of Aragon, and by his will dated 1503 he bequeathed his manor of "North Moulton in Devonshire" to his wife Margaret for her life, with other lands in Somerset to the value of 40 shillings per annum.

=== Bampfylde ===
During the reign of King Edward IV (1461–1483) William Bampfylde married Margaret St. Maur, and thus the manor eventually passed to the Bampfyldes, lords of the manor of Poltimore.

== Court House ==
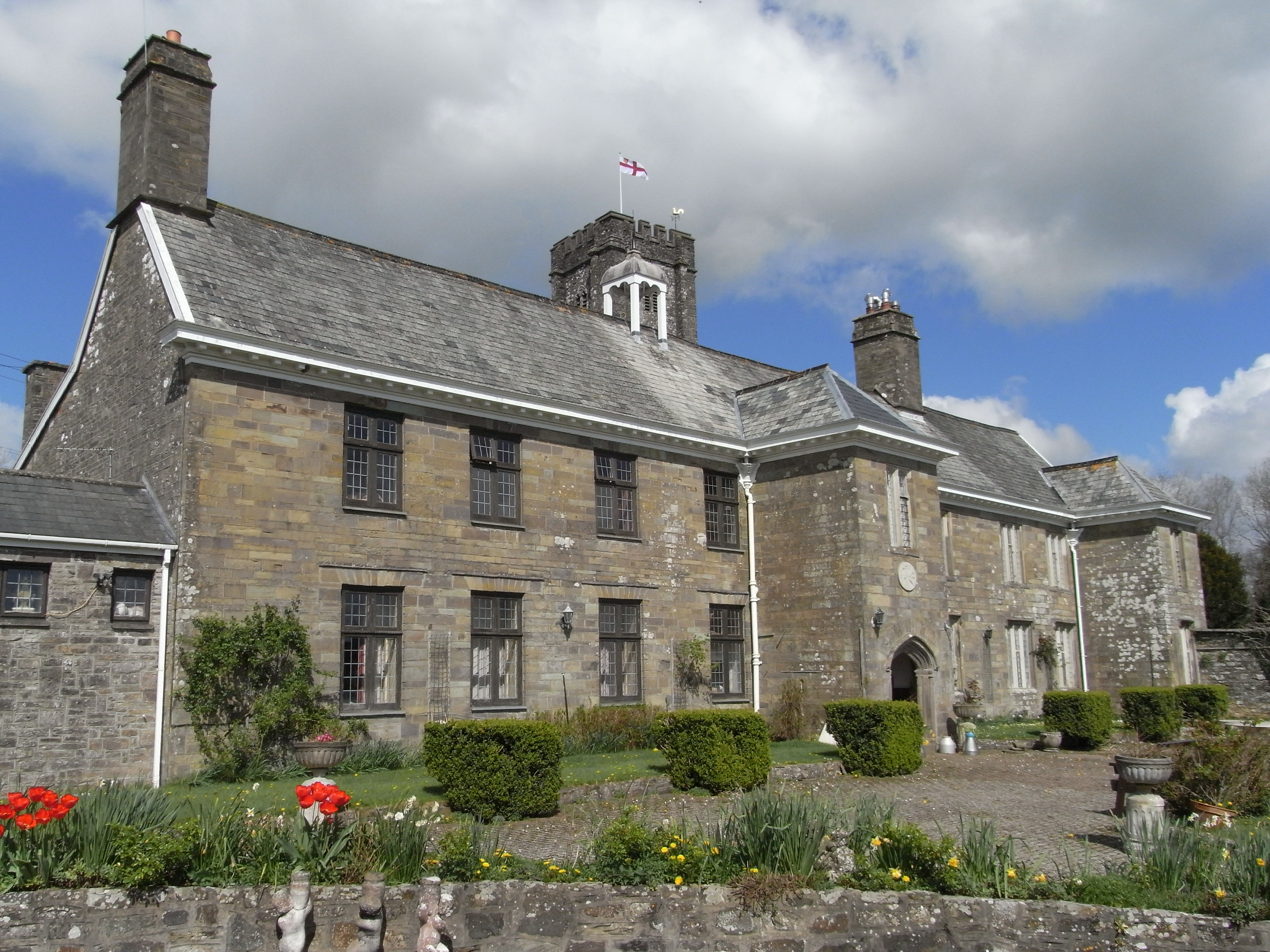
Court House, North Molton, built in 1553 by the Parker family; viewed from SW. The church tower is visible behind

Adjacent to the west of the church is "Court House", not to be confused with "Court Hall" the later residence of the Bampfyldes to the immediate east of the church. In 1550 Edmund Parker, "gent" the son and heir apparent of John Parker of North Molton, Esquire, was granted by John Zouche, Baron Zouche (of Haryngworth), by deed of gift, the office of bailiff of the manor of North Molton and lands called "Legh" for the term of his life. Three years later in 1553 the Parkers built Court House. The Parker family appear to have started as local wool-merchants. Whilst never lords of the manor of North Molton they seem to have acquired the advowson of the church shortly after the Dissolution, which they retained until after 1839, in which year they made their last appointment of the vicar.

=== Parker family ===
Arms of Parker: Sable, a stag's head cabossed between two flaunches argent; Crest: A cubit arm couped below the elbow the sleeve azure cuffed and slashed argent the hand grasping a stag's attires (i.e. antlers) gules The Parker arms later turned into the head of a buck, the male of the fallow deer, with palm-shaped antlers, as can be seen above the portico at Saltram House

The early genealogy of the Parker family as given in the heraldic visitations of Devon appears unreliable. A deed exists which records that in 1550 Edmund Parker, "gent" the son and heir apparent of John Parker of North Molton, Esquire, was granted by John la Zouche, 8th Baron Zouche (of Haryngworth), 9th Baron St Maur (c. 1486–1550), by deed of gift, the office of bailiff of the manor of North Molton and lands called "Legh" for the term of his life. Three years later in 1553 the Parkers built Court House. Having originated in North Molton and having built Court House, the Parker family steadily grew in importance. The descent of the family is given as follows in the Heralds' Visitation of Devon:

==== Thomas Parker (d.1545) ====
Thomas Parker (d.1545), buried in his family vault under the chancel, married Elizabeth Fry, a daughter and co-heiress of John Fry of "Fry's Hele" (today corrupted to "Friars Hele") in the parish of Meeth, near Hatherleigh, which was still owned by the Earl of Morley in 1822 according to Lysons, Magna Britannia. The Devon historian Tristram Risdon writing in about 1630 states in his account of Meeth: "Another barton of the same name (i.e. of "Hele") carrieth the adjunct of its ancient owners the Fryes, the last of which family had issue Elizabeth wedded to Parker of North Molton by which name Fryshele is now inherited". The senior line of the Fry family was seated at Yarty in the parish of Membury in Devon. The arms of Parker impaling Fry of Fry's Hele (Vert, three horses courant argent) appear on the wooden panelling now in the chancel of North Molton Church, formerly in Court House.

==== John Parker ====
John Parker (son), married the heiress of Thomas Ellicott of Bratton Clovelly, Devon, 8 miles west of Okehampton. The Earl of Morley still held Ellicott Barton in 1822 as reported by Lysons. It seems to have been the daughter of this John Parker, Anne Parker, who became in about 1570 the second wife of William Peryam (1534–1604), of Little Fulford near Crediton, the future Lord Chief Baron of the Exchequer. He was buried in the family vault under the chancel on 18 May 1611. The arms of Parker impaling Ellicott (Lozengy or and azure) appear on the wooden panelling now in the chancel of North Molton Church, formerly in Court House.

==== Edmund Parker (d.1635) ====
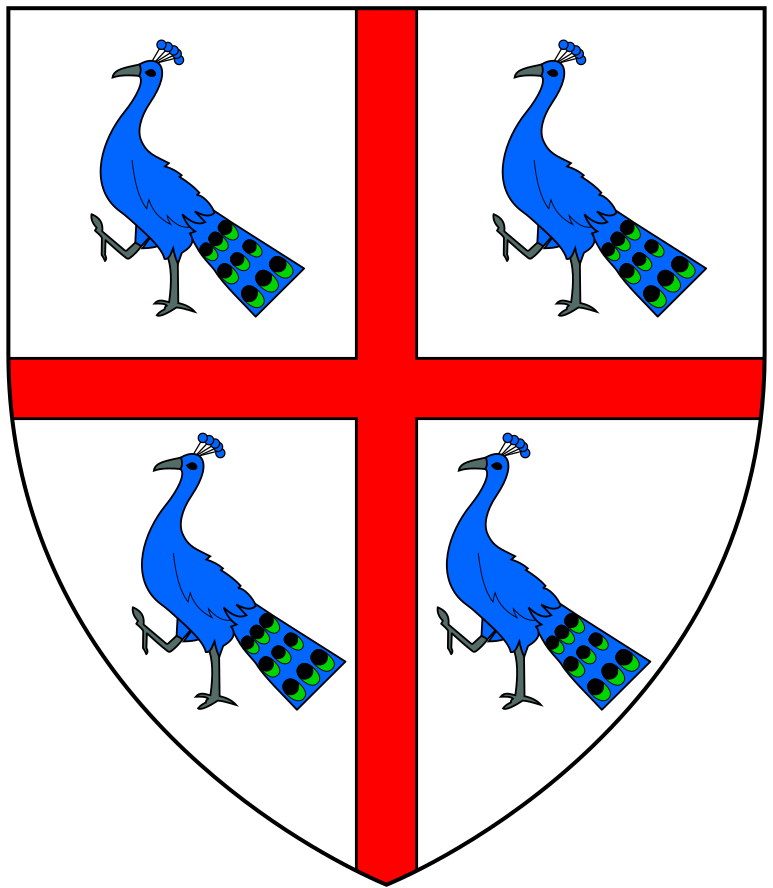
Parker impaling Argent, a cross gules between three peacocks azure (Smith of Little Baddow), oak screen, North Molton Church

Edmund Parker (d.1635) (son), who married Dorothy Smith, daughter of Clement Smith (c.1515-1552) of Great Baddow in Essex, Lord Treasurer's Remembrancer in the Exchequer (often erroneously called "Chief Baron of the Exchequer"), MP for Maldon 1545 and 1547, by his wife Dorothy Seymour, youngest daughter of Sir John Seymour (d.1536) of Wulfhall, Wiltshire, and sister of Queen Jane Seymour (d.1537), wife of King Henry VIII. Edmund Parker's wife was thus the first cousin of King Edward VI (1547–1553). Dorothy Seymour's eldest brother was Edward Seymour, 1st Duke of Somerset (d.1552), Lord Protector of England from 1547 until 1549 during the minority of his nephew, King Edward VI. The Duke's arms, a special grant from King Henry VIII, appear on the Parker panelling in North Molton Church. The peacock arms of Smith (Argent, a cross gules between four peacocks close proper) are also shown on the Parker panelling and were confirmed by the Deputies of the heralds Camden and Clarenceux, as listed in the Heralds' Visitation of Warwickshire and Leicestershire, to Francis Smyth, of Wooton, grandson of Sir John Smyth, and 5th in descent from John Carrington "or Smith" (d.1446), who was 5th in descent from Sir Michael Carrington, Standard Bearer to King Richard I, and who died in the Holy Land. In May 1635 Edmund Parker (d. August 1635) made the following grant:

Lease 1) Edmund Parker of North Molton, esquire 2) John Williams the elder, yeoman, Philip Shapland of North Molton, husbandman, John Williams the younger, all of North Molton.

Tithes, tenths, oblations, obventions and offerings arising out of the boroughs and parishes of Twitchen and North Molton. Also the Eaver barn, the two higher barns, the lower shippen [one illegible], the Mowhaie, the Courtelage below the Mowhaie, the outer Kitchen and storehouse over the same and the Chamber over the two storehouses, the deyhouse and the larder and the two [illegible] and the wool chamber adjoining with the pasturage of the grass of the churchyard [illegible], all in North Molton.Term: five years.Rent: £350 pa.

This appears to relate to the outbuildings of Court House, next to the churchyard.

===== John Parker (d.1610) =====
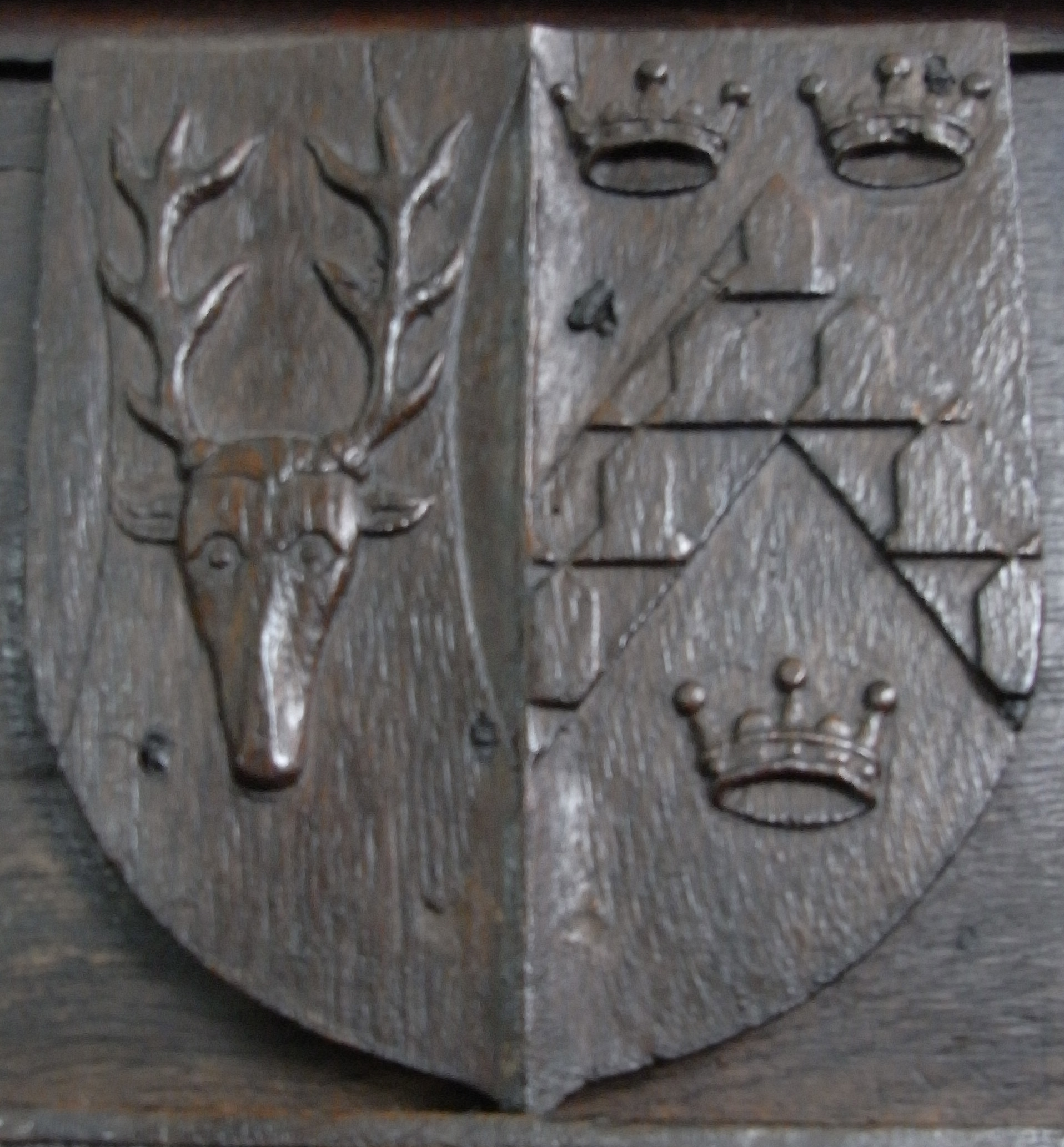
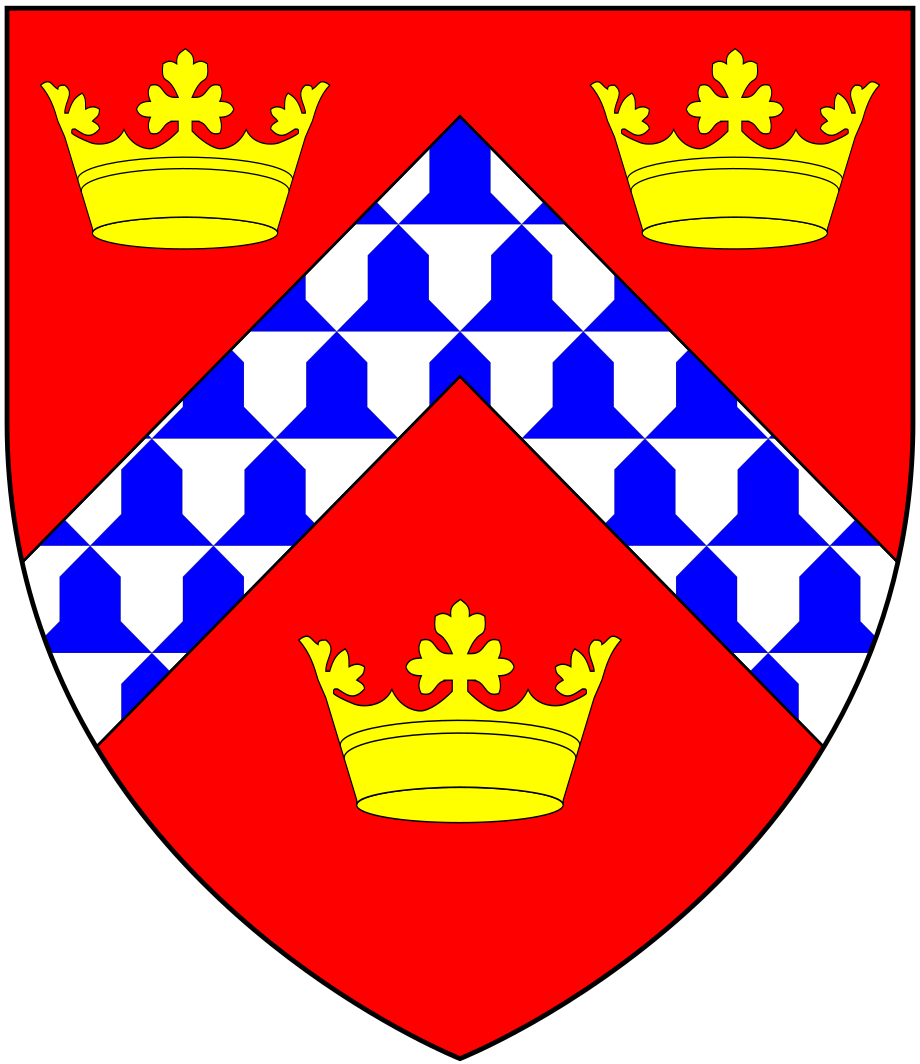
Parker impaling Gules, a chevron vairy between three ducal crowns or (Mayhew), 1609 oak panelling, North Molton Church

John Parker (d.1610) (son), who predeceased his father, was Sheriff of Devon. In 1582 he married Frances Mayhew, only child and heiress of Jerome/Jeronimy Mayhew of Boringdon manor, in the parish of Plympton St Mary, near Plymouth, Devon. The arms of Parker impaling Mayhew (Gules, a chevron vairy between three ducal crowns or) appear on the wooden panelling now in the chancel of North Molton Church, formerly in Court House. The marriage settlement dated 4 October 1582 is summarised as follows:

Marriage Settlement 1) Edmund Parker of Burley, St Thomas near Exeter, esquire 2) Fraunces Mayhowe, sole daughter and heir apparent of Jerome Mayhowe. Annuity of £66 13s 4d arising out of 1)'s lands in Plympton St Mary

Consideration: Marriage of John Parker and Fraunces Mayhowe.

A certain Richard Mayhowe of Tavistock, gent. had acquired this manor on 22 May 1549 as the following quitclaim testifies:

Quitclaim 1) Thomas Wriothesley, knight of the order of the garter, Lord Wriothesley, Duke of Southampton 2) Richard Mayhowe of Tavistock, gent.

Manor of Boringdon, formerly belonging to the now dissolved priory of Plympton

==== Edmund Parker (1592–1649) ====
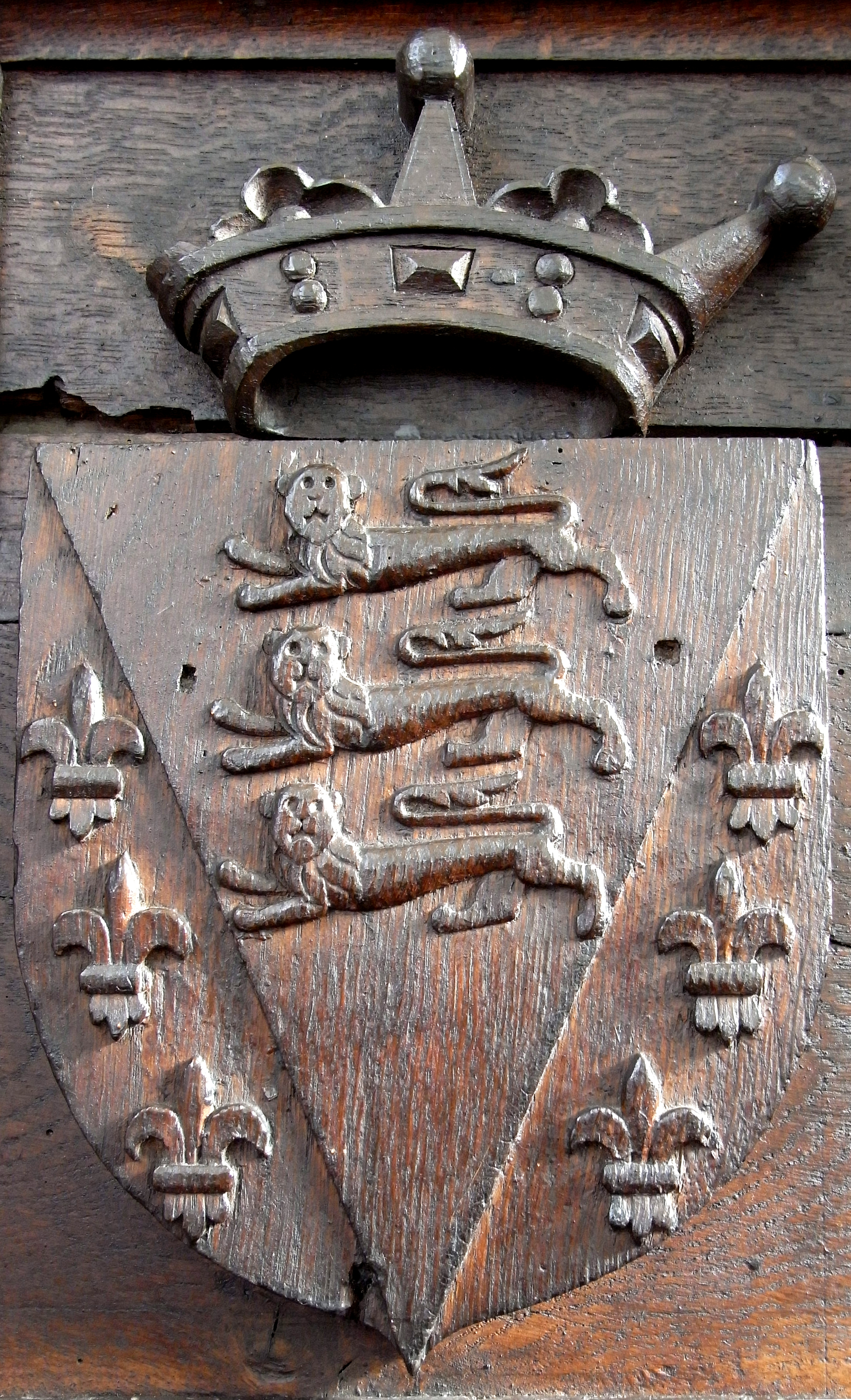
Left:Arms granted to Edward Seymour, 1st Duke of Somerset: Or, on a pile gules between six fleurs-de-lys azure three lions of England; right: as sculpted on the 1609 Court House screen now in North Molton Church, topped by a ducal crown. The arms were a special grant awarded to the duke, which did not in fact descend via the line of his eldest son from his first marriage, the Seymours of Berry Pomeroy. The Parkers were not therefore entitled to display these arms but only the old paternal Seymour arms of Gules, two wings conjoined in lure or, as seen on the 1613 Seymour monument in Berry Pomeroy Church

Arms of Seymour of Berry Pomeroy: Gules, two wings conjoined in lure or. The Seymour line of Berry Pomeroy did not inherit the special grant of arms made to the 1st Duke of Somerset, which descended to the children from his second marriage

Edmund Parker (1592–1649) (grandson, son of John Parker (d.1610)), baptised at Bratton Clovelly. He married Anna Seymour (d.1639), a daughter of the highly influential Sir Edward Seymour, 1st Baronet (c. 1563–1613) of Berry Pomeroy, Devon, grandson (in the lower ranking elder line) of Edward Seymour, 1st Duke of Somerset (c. 1500–1552), Lord Protector, brother of Queen Jane Seymour and uncle of King Edward VI.

==== Edmund Parker (1613–1691) ====
Edmund Parker (1613–1691) (son), married Alice (d.1664)

==== George Parker (1651–1743) ====
George Parker (1651–1743) (2nd and eldest surviving son), married as his second wife Anne Buller, daughter of John Buller (d.1716), MP, of Morval in Cornwall. In 1712 he purchased the manor of Saltram, near Boringdon, from the Carteret family.

==== John Parker (1703–1768) ====
John Parker (1703–1768) (3rd and eldest surviving son), married Catherine Poulett, daughter of Queen Anne's minister John Poulett, 1st Earl Poulett (d.1743) and made Saltram his chief seat, having embarked on an ambitious re-building programme, perhaps influenced by the 1730s re-modelling by Hugh Fortescue, 14th Baron Clinton (1696–1751) at Castle Hill, Filleigh.

==== John Parker, 1st Baron Boringdon (1735–1788) ====
John Parker, 1st Baron Boringdon (1735–1788) (son), who married as his second wife Hon. Theresa Robinson (1744/5-1775), second daughter of Thomas Robinson, 1st Baron Grantham.

==== John Parker, 1st Earl of Morley (1772–1840) ====
John Parker, 1st Earl of Morley (1772–1840) (son), who was created Viscount Boringdon and Earl of Morley in 1815.

=== Description ===
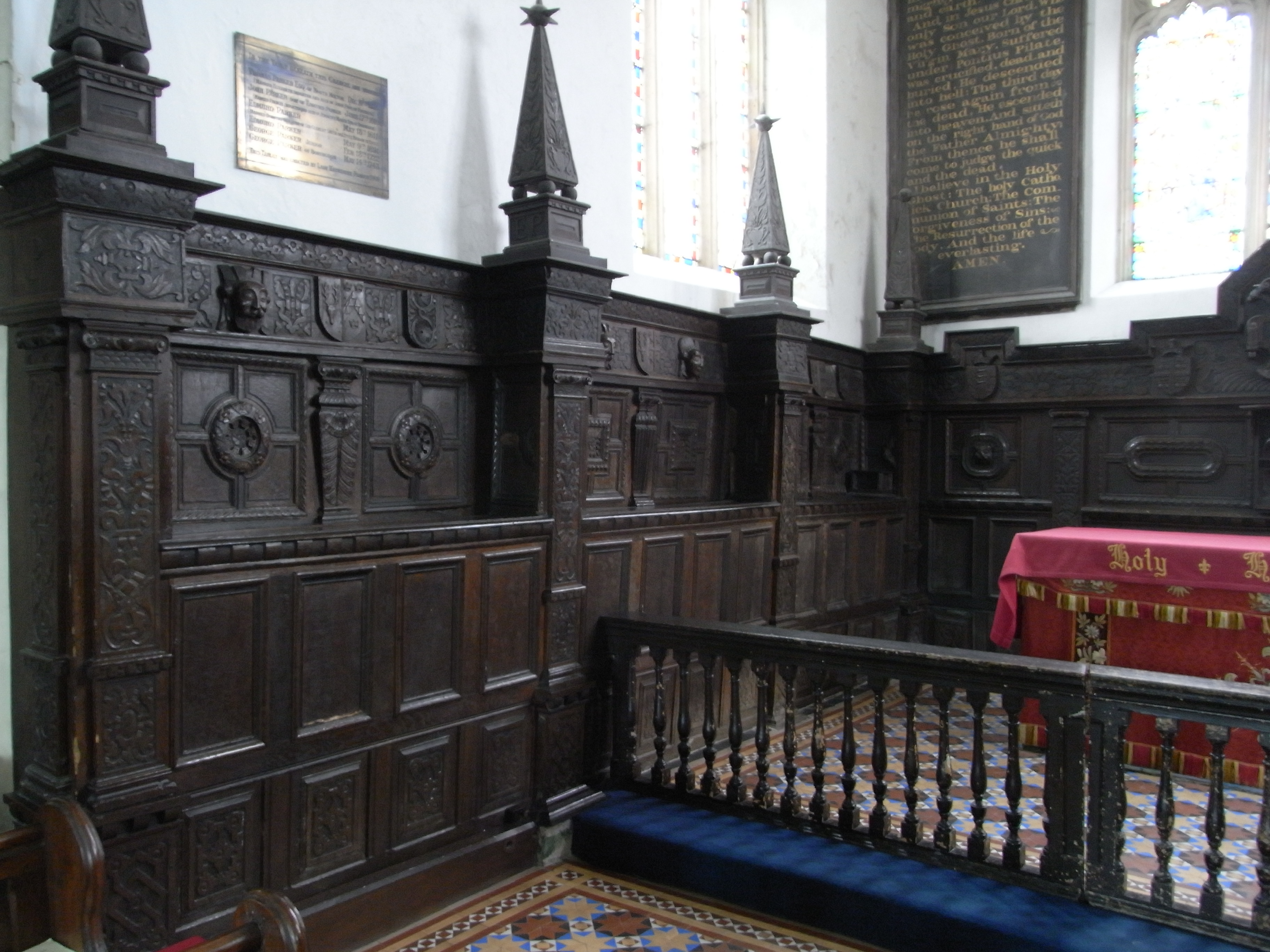
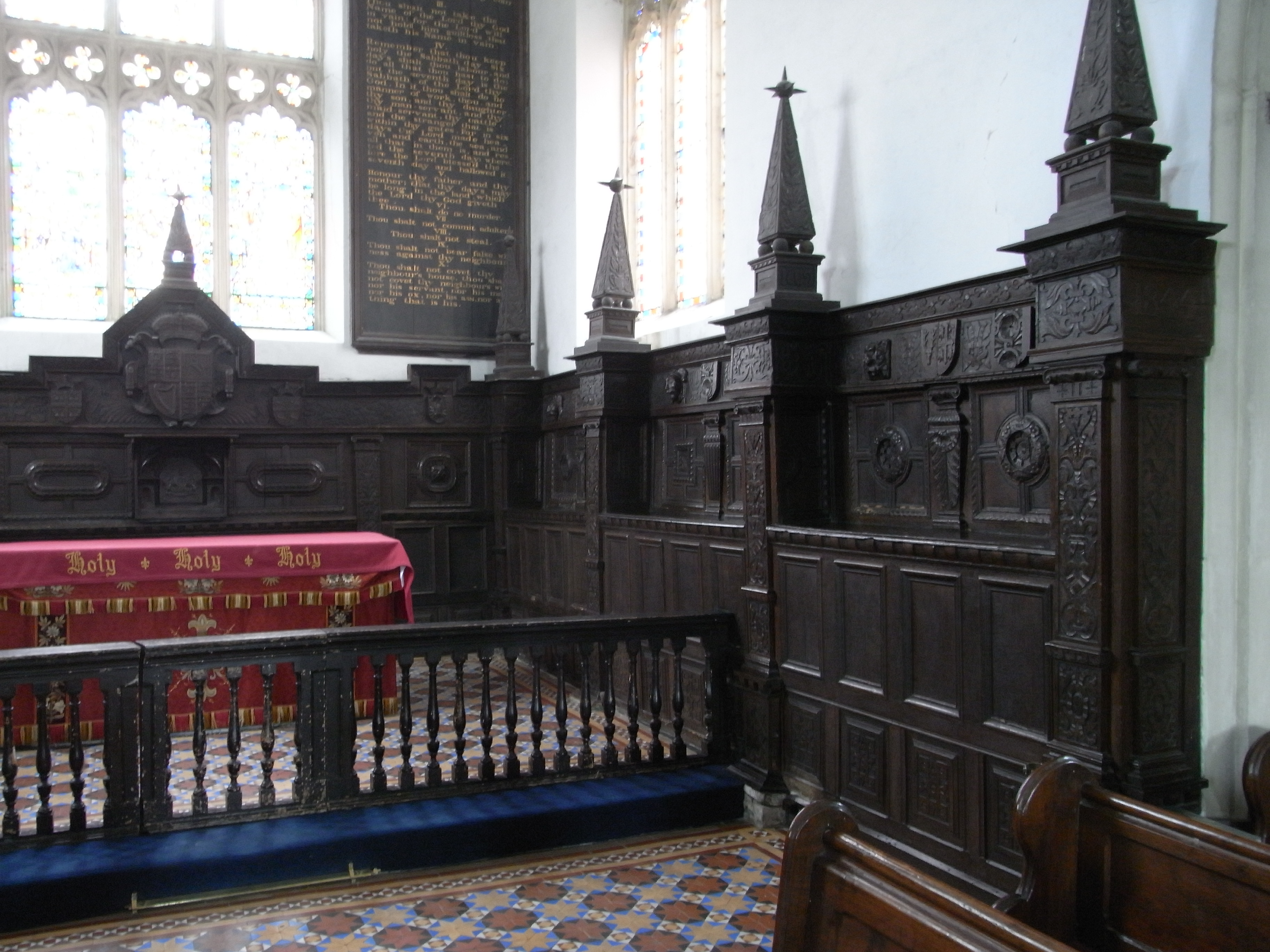
Oak panelling dated 1609 with sculpted heraldry of Parker family. Removed in the 19th century to the chancel of North Molton Church from Court House

Court House was built in 1553 and its front is long and of two storeys. One room contains Tudor panelling and a fireplace surround from Poltimore House dated to 1692. Other oak panelling from Court House now lines the chancel of North Molton Church. Carved with arms of the Parker family and families with which they were connected, this panelling probably dates from around the 1650s and was moved to the church in the 1840s.

== Court Hall ==
Arms of Bampfylde of Poltimore and North Molton: Or, on a bend gules three mullets argent

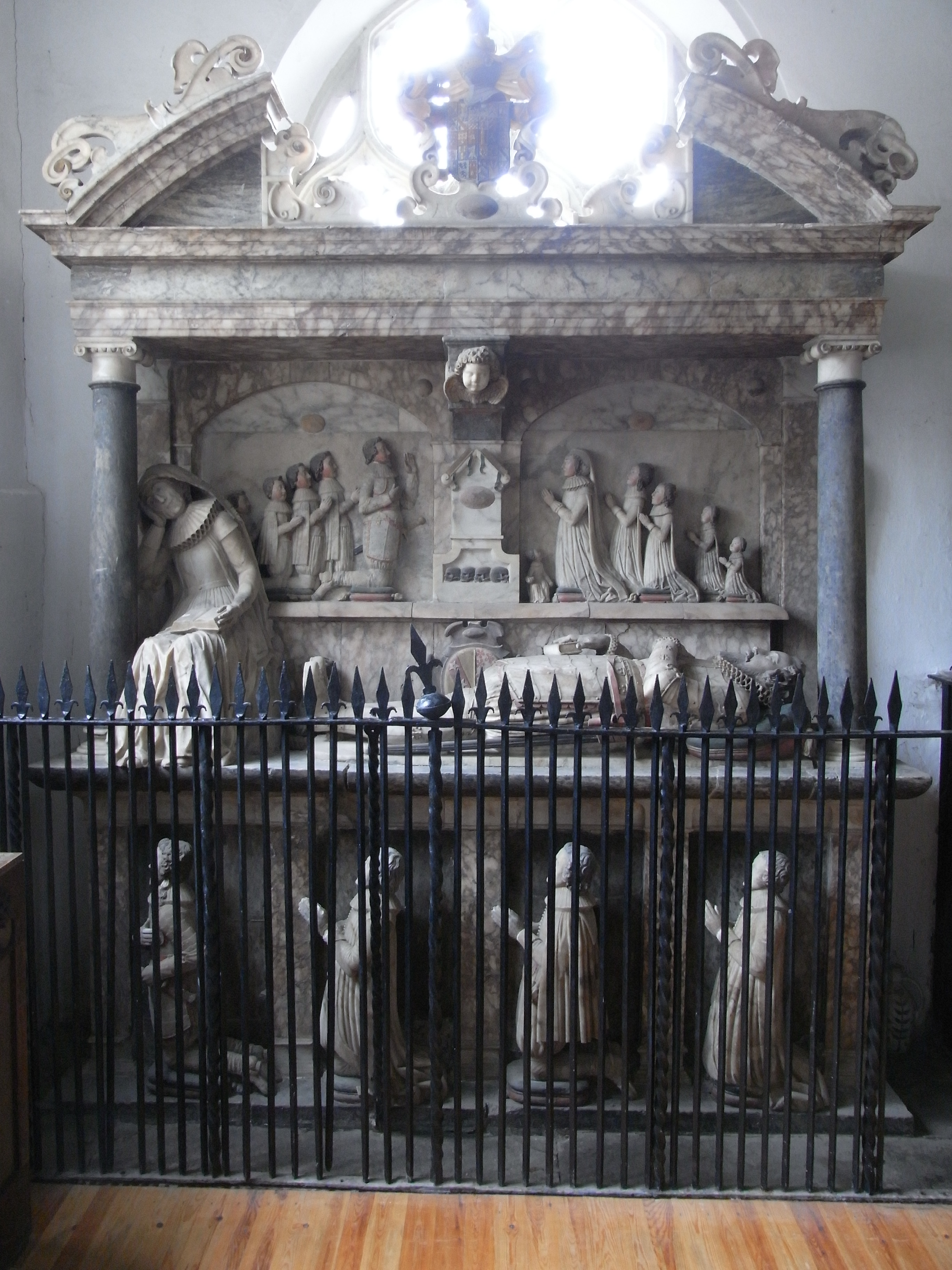
Monument to Sir Amyas Bampfylde (d.1626), south wall of south aisle chapel ("Bampfylde Chapel")

The original Jacobean "Court Hall" to the immediate east of the church was built by Sir Amyas Bampfylde (d.1626). It was enlarged in 1835 by his George Bampfylde, 1st Baron Poltimore (d.1858), 7th in descent from Sir Amyas, shortly after his elevation to the peerage in 1831. The family's main seat was at Poltimore House near Exeter, in south Devon, now in a ruinous state, and Court Hall served largely as a hunting lodge for which its proximity to Exmoor with its red deer served well. By 1841 the Bampfylde family owned 10,000 acres of the 15,000 covered by North Molton parish, the second largest in Devon. Following the death in 1936 due to an accident of Hon. Coplestone John de Grey Warwick Bampfylde (d.1936), the only son and heir of George Wentworth Warwick Bampfylde, 4th Baron Poltimore (1882–1965), the 4th Baron Poltimore moved to Rhodesia in the 1950s. Although his heir to the barony was his younger brother Arthur Blackett Warwick Bampfylde, 5th Baron Poltimore (1883–1967), Lord Poltimore was free to dispose of his manorial lands at North Molton as he pleased. The Barons Poltimore have since resided at The Ancient House, Peasenhall, Saxmundham in Suffolk. About half of the estate was sold to the tenant farmers, and Lord Poltimore's daughter Lady Stucley remained to administer the remnant. Lady Stucley, née Hon. Sheila Margaret Warwick Bampfylde (b.1912), married Sir Dennis Stucley, 5th Baronet (1907–1983) of Hartland Abbey and Affeton Castle both in North Devon. The additional property of Court Hall was therefore no longer needed by the family and it was let as a private nursery school. When the school closed the house was found to be in poor repair and the main part was demolished leaving only the servants' wing which had been added in 1902. The property is still owned by a descendant of Lord Poltimore, in the person of Mrs Sara Susan Worthington (b.1942), née Stucley, youngest daughter of Sir Dennis Bankes Stucley, 5th Bt., by his wife Hon. Sheila Bampfylde. She married firstly in 1963, and later divorced, Sir Michael Peto, 4th Baronet (1938–2008), by whom she had issue Sir Henry Christopher Morton Bampfylde Peto, 5th Baronet (b.1967). She married secondly, as his second wife, Capt. Charles William David Worthington (b.1930) of Kingston Russell House, Dorset. He is the son of Lt William Greville Worthington (d.1942), RNVR, by his wife Lady (Mary) Diana Duncombe (1905–1943), daughter of Charles Duncombe, 2nd Earl of Feversham (d.1916) by Lady Mary Blanche Eva Greville (d.1964), daughter of Francis Greville, 5th Earl of Warwick. Court Hall has functioned from about 2008 as a bed and breakfast hotel. The family also still retains substantial land at North Molton on which it operates a commercial game-bird shoot, leased to a syndicate.

== Historic estates ==
The following are some of the historic estates which were at one time situated within the manor or parish of North Molton:

=== Molland-Sarazen ===
Text of Exeter Domesday Book for Molland sub-manor, later called "Molland-Sarazen", in North Molton hundred

One of three entries for "Molland" in the Exeter Domesday Book of 1086 relates to a small sub-manor now in the parish of North Molton. This manor in the former North Molton hundred was held by Tetbald, son of Berner, and is unrelated to today's Molland village, parish, estate and former manor. It is memorialised today by Molland Cross and Molland Farm, north west of North Molton village. Risdon (c. 1630) confused this manor with Molland-Champson, in today's parish of Molland. It was at one time held by Ralph Sarazenus (the Latinised form of the name), and took the name "Molland-Sarazen". In 1326 it was held as one knight's fee from the feudal barony of Great Torrington, the lord of 1/5th of which was William FitzMartin, also feudal baron of Barnstaple, who died sine prole in 1326. His inquisition post mortem lists all his land-holdings including under the section "Fees pertaining to a fifth part of the barony of Toryton": "Mollond: 1 fee held by Thomas Sarasin".

=== Sannacott ===
In 1489 following the death of Sir Richard Edgecumbe, a successor to the Zouche family as feudal baron of Totnes, it is recorded in his inquisition post mortem that he held in addition to that barony, among other holdings: "a messuage, 40 acres arable, 20 acres meadow, 60 acres furze and heather in Swancote within the manor of North Molton, worth 13 shillings and 4 pence".

=== Pulham & Praunsley ===
In the Domesday Book of 1086 Polham (Pulham) was one of 31 Devon landholdings held in chief from the king by Roald Dubbed, about whom little is known. It had been held before 1066 by two thanes freely and jointly. His tenant there was Reginald, who held other lands from him also. Attached to this estate was Plantelie (Praunsley), which survive today as two neighbouring farms now in the parish of Twitchen, formerly within North Molton manor. Praunsley together with neighbouring Millbrook, passed at some time to the ownership of Pilton Priory and following the dissolution of the monasteries was one of its many holdings acquired in 1544 by George Rolle (d.1552) of Stevenstone and George Haydon, co-MP's for Barnstaple in 1545. Its tenant was then Bartholomew Staveley, and its annual value was 8 shillings 6 pence. Both these farms were sold by Lord Poltimore to their tenants in the early 20th century.

=== Millbrook ===
Held by Pilton Priory and following the dissolution of the monasteries was one of its many holdings acquired by George Rolle (d.1552) of Stevenstone.

== Sources ==
- Cherry, Bridget & Pevsner, Nikolaus, The Buildings of England: Devon. Yale University Press, 2004. ISBN 978-0-300-09596-8
- Lysons, Daniel and Samuel, Magna Britannia, Volume 6, Devonshire, 1822, General History: Nobility, pp. 83–95, pedigree of Parker
- Plymouth and West Devon Record Office, Morley of Saltram, 69/M/5/1 - 69/M/11/8
- Plymouth & West Devon Record Office, Morley of Saltram, 69/P/1/1-69/M/4/574
