= Frances Talbot, Countess of Morley =

English countess

The Right Honourable The Countess of Morley
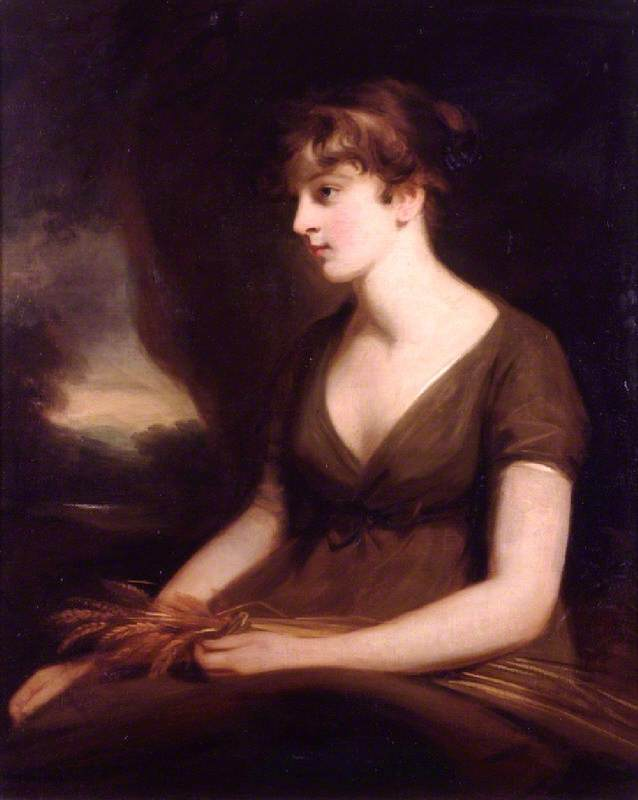
- Frances Talbot as 'Lavinia', painted by Thomas Phillips
- Born: 1782
- Died: 6 December 1857 (aged 74–75)
- Spouse: John Parker, 1st Earl of Morley
- Children: Edmund; Caroline
- Father: Thomas Talbot

Frances Talbot, Countess of Morley (married name Frances Parker; 1782–1857) was an English author and illustrator, best known as a correspondent of Jane Austen. By her marriage to John Parker, 1st Earl of Morley, she became the Countess of Morley.

== Family ==
Frances Talbot was the daughter of a surgeon, Thomas Talbot of Wymondham. Her brother, Thomas Sugden Talbot, was a clergyman. This branch of the Talbot family was a junior branch of the Talbots of Salesbury and Bashall, and had acquired their estate of Gonville Hall during the reign of Queen Elizabeth I.

== Marriage ==
Talbot married John Parker, then Baron Boringdon, in August 1809. It was his second marriage, the first one having ended in scandal. His first wife, a daughter of the Earl of Westmorland, divorced him and married Arthur Paget as a result of her husband's many infidelities. Parker had actually attempted to start an affair with Talbot earlier, but she had refused. Talbot's marriage to Parker would prove more successful than his first one; they were married for thirty-one years. She was the mother of Parker's second legitimate son, Edmund Parker, 2nd Earl of Morley, who would later succeed to the earldom (as the elder son died young), as well as a daughter, Caroline, who died in 1818 at the age of four.

== Literary interests ==
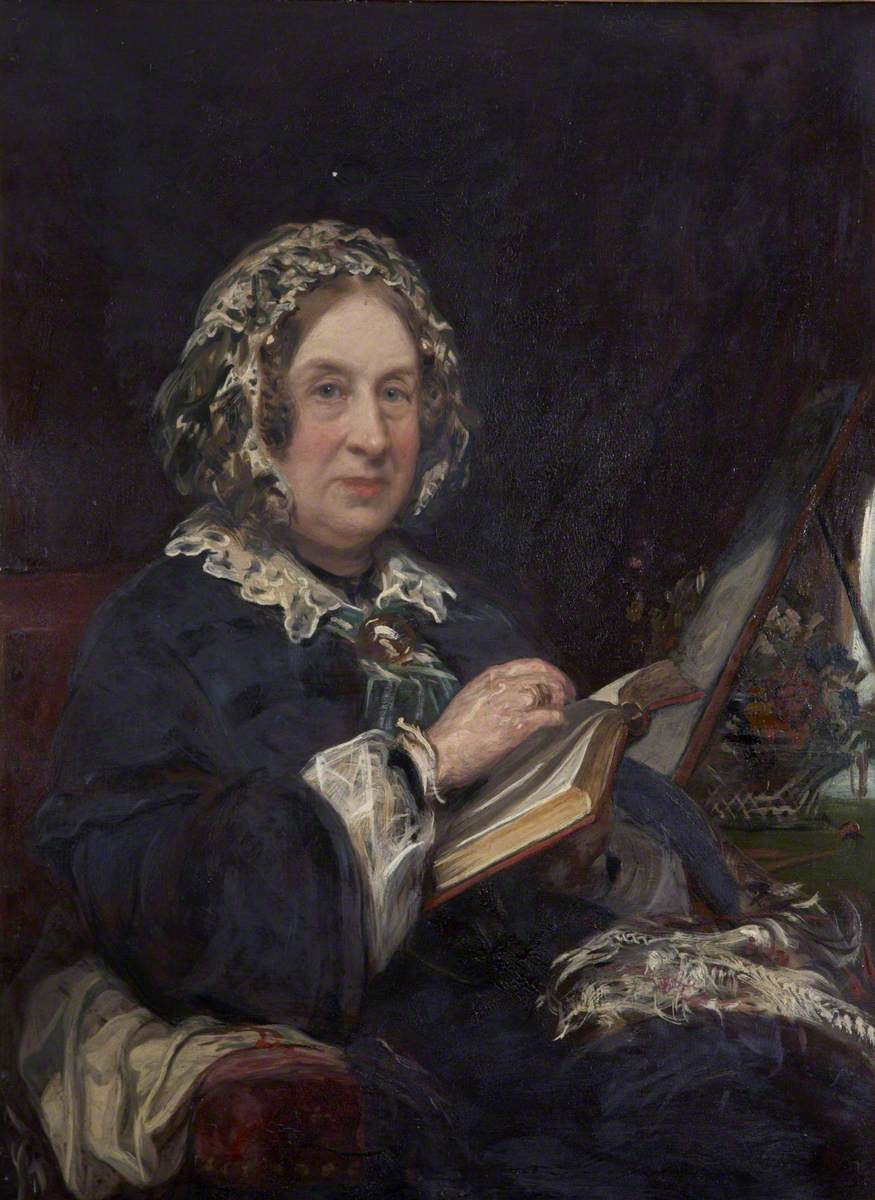
Francis Talbot, Countess of Morley painted by James Sant, c.1852

Talbot was an early admirer of the work of Jane Austen, though it is not clear how they came to be acquainted; it is possible that they were introduced through Austen's brother, Henry Thomas Austen. Talbot was the author of one of the five known surviving letters written to Jane Austen, and she received a personal copy of Emma from Austen. Talbot was mistakenly identified as a possible author of both Pride and Prejudice and Sense and Sensibility; strangely enough, her husband's first wife was also sometimes put forth as a possible author of the latter novel.

Talbot was herself an artist, illustrator, and novelist. She wrote several novels, including The Flying Burgomaster (1832), The Royal Intellectual Bazaar (1832), and The Man Without a Name (1852), and edited Dacre (1834). She lithographed the plates for Portraits of the Spruggins Family, another work to which she was mistakenly attributed authorship.

== Death ==
Talbot died at Saltram on 6 December 1857 and was buried in the family vault at Plympton St Mary.
