= Antonio Zucchi =

Italian painter (1726–1795)

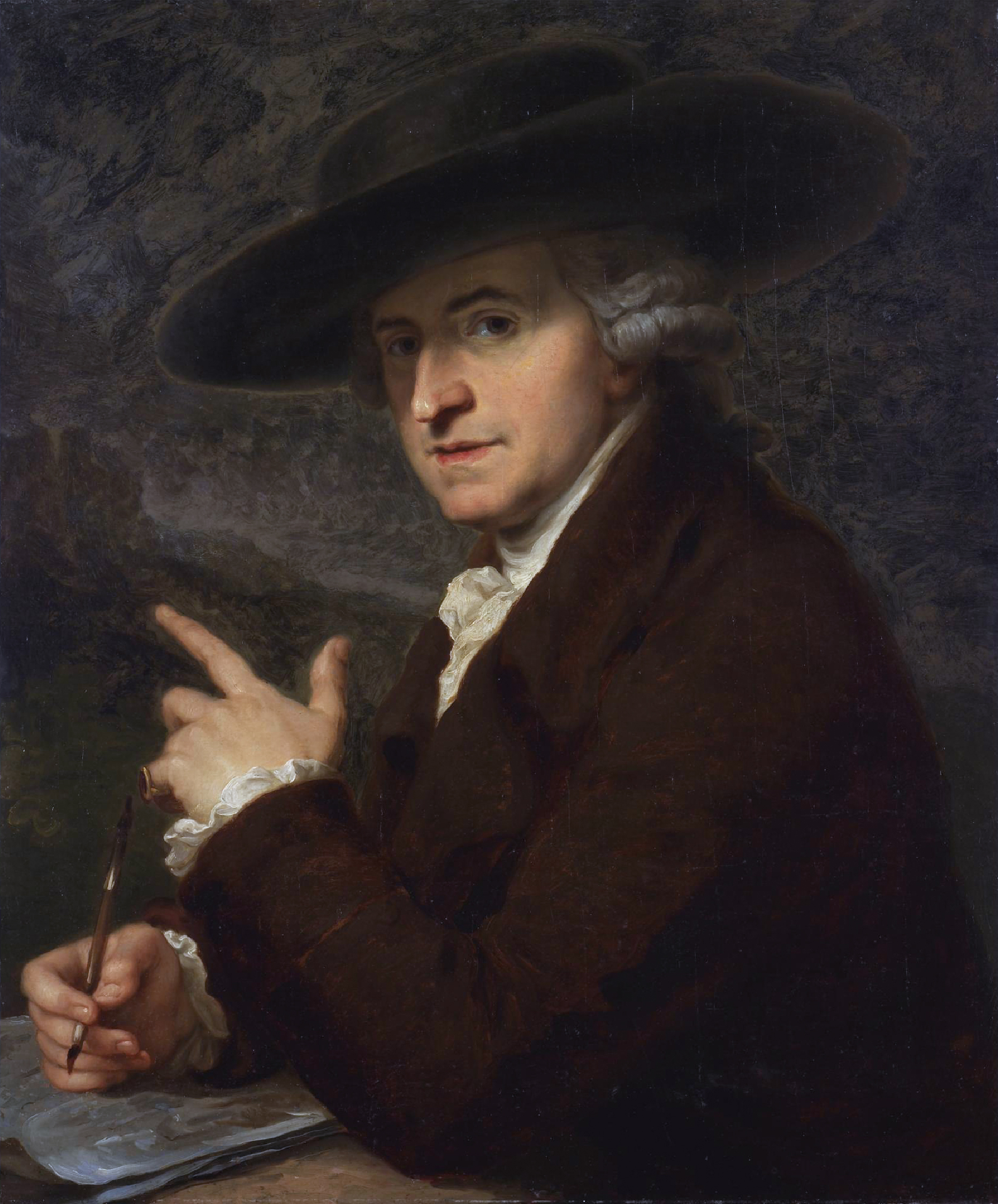
- Portrait (1781) by his wife, Angelica Kauffman
- Born: 1 May 1726; Venice, Republic of Venice
- Died: 26 December 1795 (aged 69); Rome, Papal States
- Known for: Painting
- Movement: Vedutisti

Antonio Pietro Francesco Zucchi ARA (1 May 1726 – 1 December 1795) was an Italian painter and printmaker of the Neoclassic period.

== Life ==
Zucchi was born in Venice, he studied under his uncle Carlo Zucchi and later Francesco Fontebasso and Jacopo Amigoni.

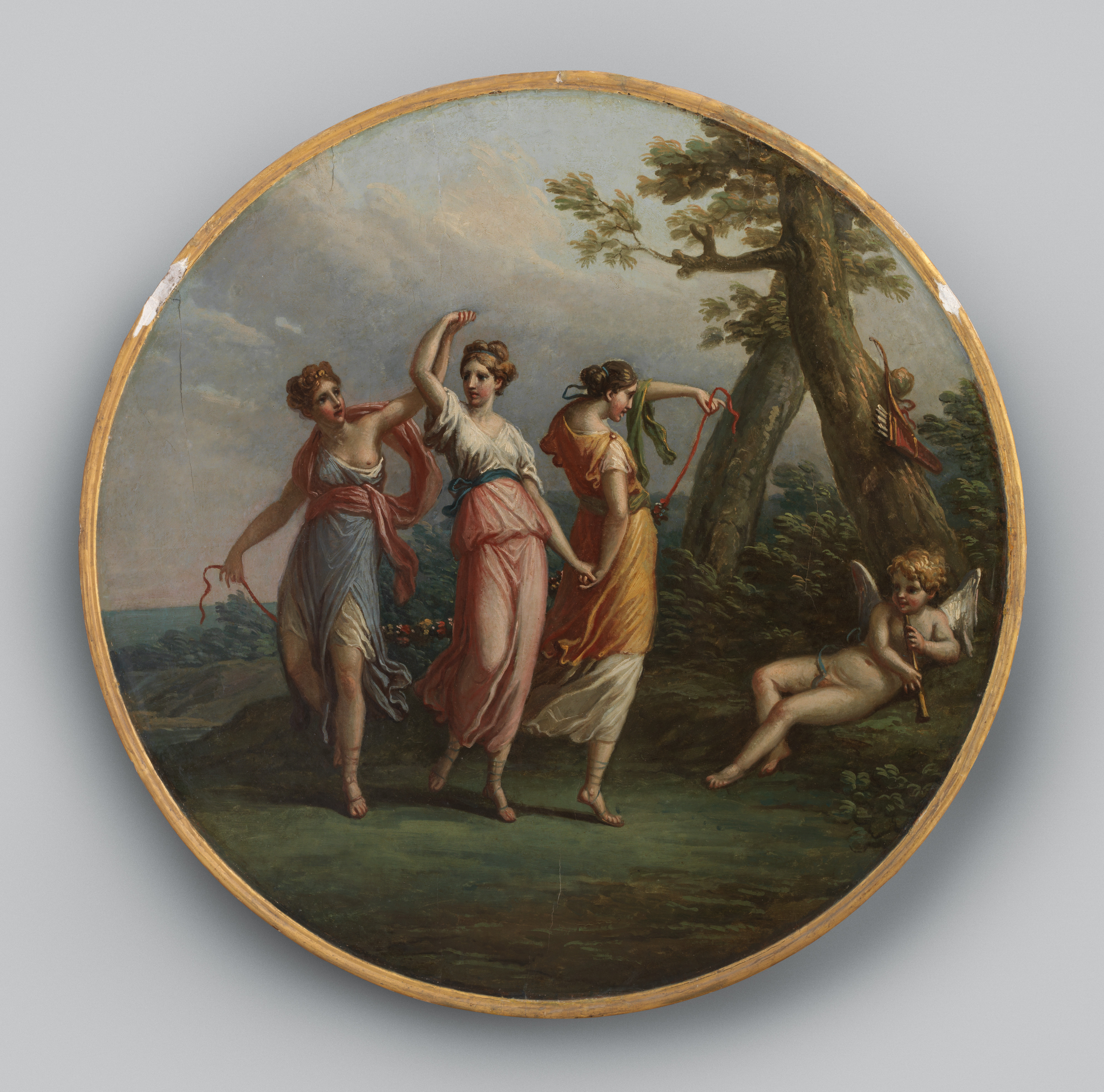
"Three dancing nymphs and a reclining cupid in a landscape" by Zucchi

He married the painter Angelica Kauffman in 1781, who late in life moved with him to Rome. In Rome Zucchi produced a number of etchings of capriccio and veduta of classical buildings or ruins. He worked with Robert Adam in the decoration of houses in England, including Kenwood, Newby Hall, Osterley Park, Nostell Priory, and Luton House.

In 1756, he was elected to the membership of the Accademia di Belle Arti in Venice. In England, he was elected as an associate to the Royal Academy of Arts in 1770.

Lady Boringdon commissioned him to paint the ceilings of rooms redesigned by Robert Adam at Saltram House in Devon. She also bought paintings from his wife for the house.

He died in Rome in 1795.
