= Theresa Parker =

English noblewoman, designer and art patron

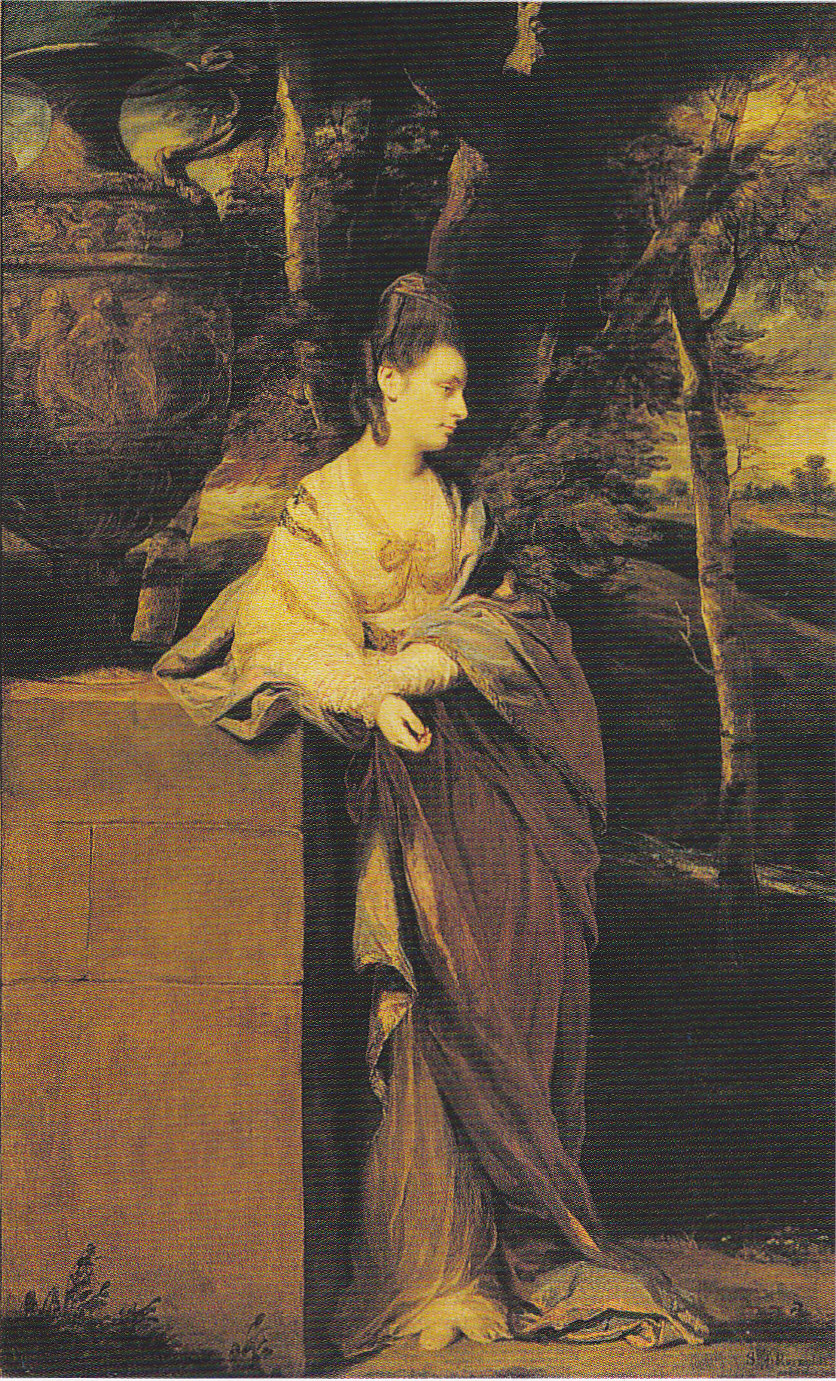
- Born: Theresa Robinson; 1 January 1745; Vienna
- Died: 21 December 1775 (aged 30)
- Occupation: Patron of the arts
- Known for: overseeing the design of Saltram House
- Spouse: John Parker, 1st Baron Boringdon
- Children: 2, Including John Parker, 1st Earl of Morley
- Parent(s): Thomas Robinson, 1st Baron Grantham and Frances Worsley

The Hon. Theresa Parker, (née Robinson; 1 January 1745 – 21 December 1775) was an English noblewoman, designer and art patron. She bought paintings by Joshua Reynolds and Angelica Kauffman and oversaw the interior design and golden age of Saltram House.

== Life ==
Daughter of Thomas Robinson, 1st Baron Grantham and Frances Worsley, Parker was born in Vienna, where her father was the British ambassador. The empress Maria Theresa stood as her godmother, and Theresa's name reflected this.

She married John Parker, 1st Baron Boringdon in 1769. He had succeeded his father the year before but he was not to become Baron Boringdon until 1784. Her new husband's interests included drinking and gambling but Theresa, her sister Alice, and her brothers Frederick and Thomas, took an interest in decorating Saltram House. Her siblings advised on the embellishment of the house via correspondence with Theresa. She is credited with making Saltram a "showpiece of South West England. The six years until Theresa's death at the age of 30 are considered Saltram's golden age. The house owns ten portraits by Joshua Reynolds. Reynolds who was her friend spent two years trying to complete a profile picture of her. Robert Adam was commissioned in 1768 to create the saloon and the library (the library is now the dining room). Adam, created everything from the door handles to the huge plasterwork ceiling. Thomas Chippendale made the furniture and Matthew Boulton made the four candelabras. She and her husband spent £10,000 on the saloon.

She directed the design of the gardens and she had buildings built including an orangery she designed and her brother, Baron Grantham, designed in 1771 a summerhouse known as the Castle. Her brother admired her designs for an inkstand and she bought black Wedgewood and other ceramics for the house. With Reynolds assistance she bought paintings by Philippe Jacques de Loutherbourg, George Stubbs, Angelica Kauffman and Antonio Zucchi painted the ceilings of her new rooms.

In September 1775 she suffered a miscarriage after a fever and died of resulting complications on 21 December. Her obituary was written by Joshua Reynolds.

== Family ==
Her husband married Frances Hort in 1764. After her death, he married Theresa on 18 May 1769. The couple had two children. Their son John Parker, 1st Earl of Morley (1772–1840) became Viscount Boringdon and Earl of Morley in 1815, and their daughter, Theresa Parker (1775–1856), married George Villiers (1759–1827), youngest son of Thomas Villiers, 1st Earl of Clarendon.
