= John Parker, 1st Earl of Morley =

British peer and politician (1772–1840)

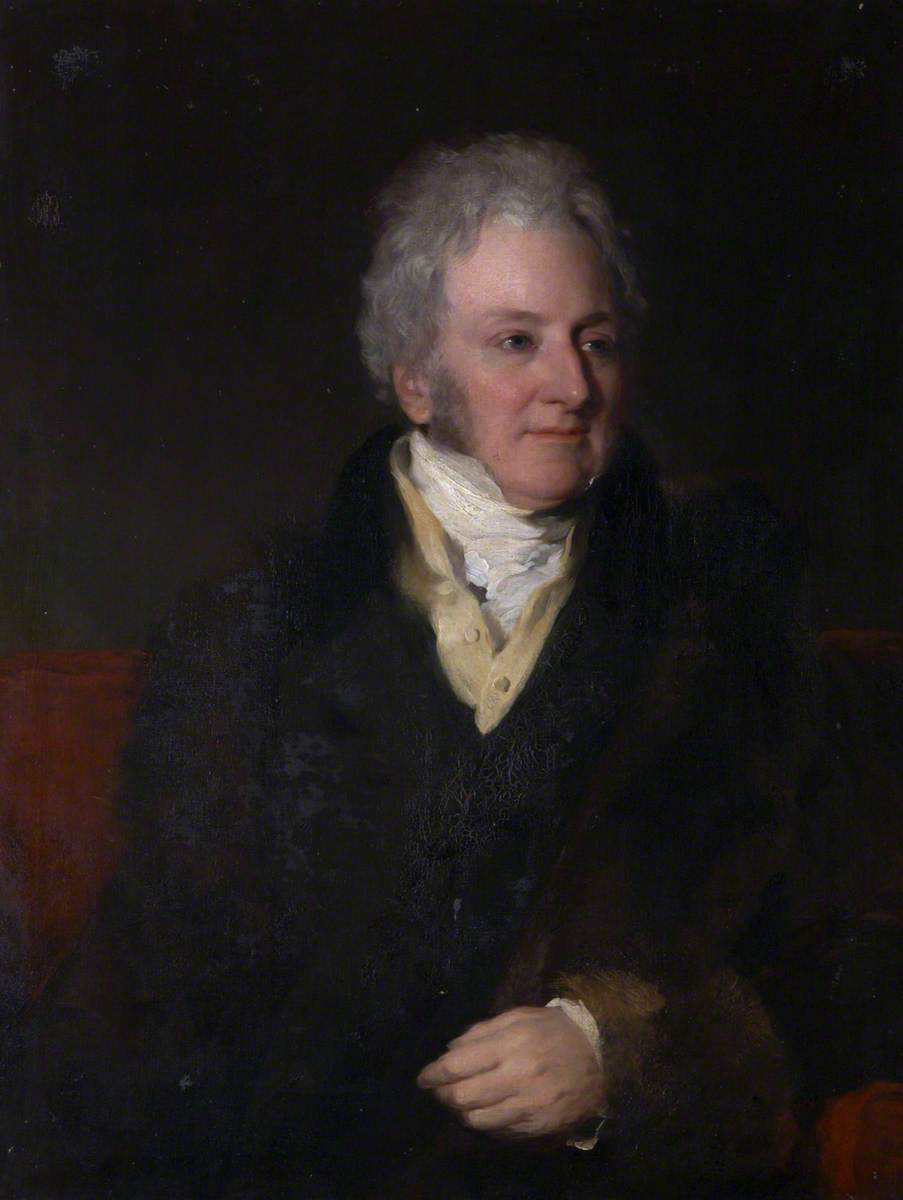
John Parker, 1st Earl of Morley (1772-1840)

Arms of Parker: Sable, a stag's head cabossed between two flaunches argent

John Parker, 1st Earl of Morley FRS (3 May 1772 – 14 March 1840), known as 2nd Baron Boringdon from 1788 to 1815, was a British peer and politician.

== Origins ==
Morley was the only son of John Parker, 1st Baron Boringdon, of Boringdon Hall, Plympton, of Court House, North Molton, and of Saltram, all in Devon, and his second wife Theresa Robinson, daughter of Thomas Robinson, 1st Baron Grantham. His mother died when he was three years old and his father when he was fifteen. His parents had employed the architect Robert Adam to complete the interior of Saltram House, rebuilt by his own father John Parker as one of the grandest houses in Devon. The Parker family had risen to prominence in the mid-16th century as the bailiff of the manor of North Molton, Devon, under Baron Zouche of Haryngworth.

== Education ==
He was educated locally at Plympton Grammar School (which his father's friend the painter Sir Joshua Reynolds (1723–1792) had also attended) within walking distance of Saltram House, and at Christ Church, Oxford.

== Career ==
Morley took his seat in the House of Lords on his 21st birthday in 1793. He was an active member of the House of Lords, initially supporting government policies until the death of William Pitt the Younger in 1806. After Pitt's death he supported George Canning, with whom he corresponded on political matters for many years. In 1815 he was created Viscount Boringdon, of North Molton in the County of Devon, and Earl of Morley, in the County of Devon. After Canning's death in 1827 he began to support the Whigs, and voted for the Reform Act 1832. Apart from his involvement in national politics, Morley was also a great benefactor to public works in his home county of Devon and was a Fellow of the Royal Society. He made only minor additions to the family seat at Saltram, including the porch and enlargement of the library, 1818–20.

== Marriage and children ==
Morley married twice:

- Firstly in 1804 to Lady Augusta Fane, second daughter of John Fane, 10th Earl of Westmorland, from whom he was divorced by Act of Parliament in 1809, after which she remarried to Sir Arthur Paget. By his first wife he had one son, who died young:
  - Henry Villiers Parker, Viscount Boringdon (28 May 1806 – 1 November 1817)
- Secondly in 1809 he married Frances Talbot (1782–1857), only daughter of Thomas Talbot of Gonville and Wymondham, by whom he had one son and one daughter:
  - Edmund Parker, 2nd Earl of Morley (1810–1864), only son and heir, a lord-in-waiting to Queen Victoria.
  - Caroline Parker, (1814-1818)

== Death ==
Lord Morley died at his seat of Saltram House in March 1840, aged 67, and was succeeded in his titles by his only son Edmund Parker, 2nd Earl of Morley (1810-1864).

Peerage of Great Britain
Preceded by John Parker	Baron Boringdon; 1788–1840	Succeeded by Edmund Parker
Peerage of the United Kingdom
New creation	Earl of Morley; 1815–1840	Succeeded by Edmund Parker
