= John Parker, 1st Baron Boringdon =

British peer and Member of Parliament (1735-1788)

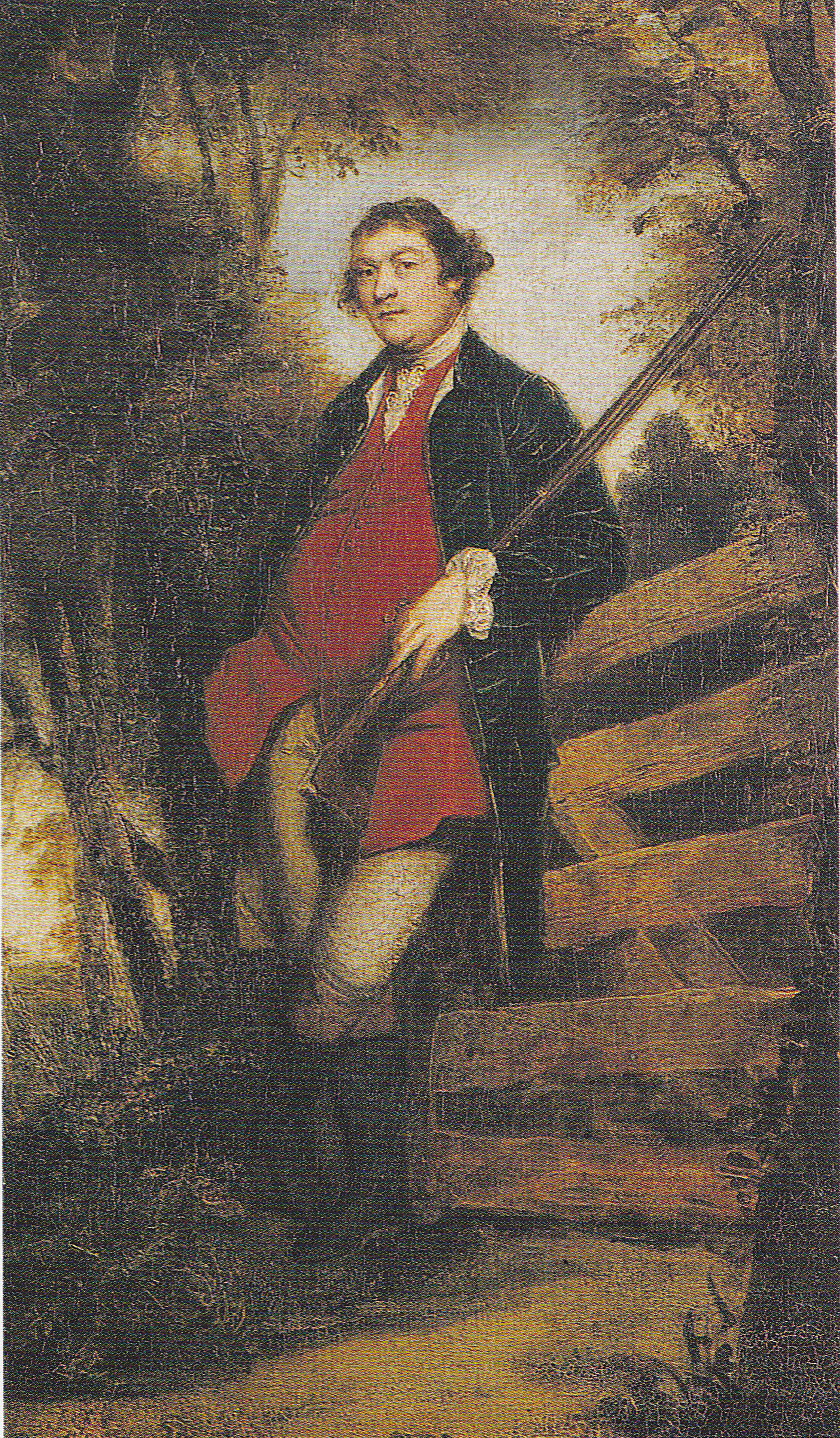
Portrait of John Parker, 1st Baron Boringdon (1734/5-1788), by his friend Sir Joshua Reynolds (d.1792), who was born near Saltram in Plympton. National Trust, Saltram House Collection, no.29, displayed in the Morning Room, Saltram House

Arms of Parker: Sable, a stag's head cabossed between two flaunches argent

John Parker, 1st Baron Boringdon (1735 – 27 April 1788) was a British peer and Member of Parliament.

== Origins ==
Parker was the eldest son of John Parker (1703–1768) of Boringdon Hall, Plympton, and Saltram House, by his wife Catherine Poulett (1706–1758), whom he married in 1725, a daughter of John Poulett, 1st Earl Poulett, by his wife, Bridget Bertie, a granddaughter of Montagu Bertie, 2nd Earl of Lindsey. He had a sister Henrietta Parker (d. 1808) and a younger brother, Montagu Edmund Parker (1737–1813) of Whiteway House, near Chudleigh (purchased by his grandfather George Parker (d. 1743) who also purchased Saltram), Sheriff of Devon in 1789, who married in 1775 Charity Ourry (1752–1786), daughter of Admiral Paul Ourry, by whom he had issue Montague E. Parker (1778–1831) whose daughter Harriet Parker (1809–1897) married in 1842, as her second husband, her second cousin Edmund Parker, 2nd Earl of Morley (1810–1864).

== Career ==
He was educated at Christ Church, Oxford. John attended Plympton Grammar School where Sir Joshua Reynold's father was headmaster.

He was elected to the House of Commons for Bodmin in 1761, a seat he held until 1762, and then represented Devon between 1762 and 1784. The latter year Parker was raised to the peerage as Baron Boringdon, of Boringdon in the County of Devon.

Apart from his political career he was also a collector of paintings at his seat Saltram House in Devon. He was elected a Fellow of the Royal Society in April 1767. In 1783, Parker's horse Saltram won the fourth running of The Derby.

== Marriage and progeny ==
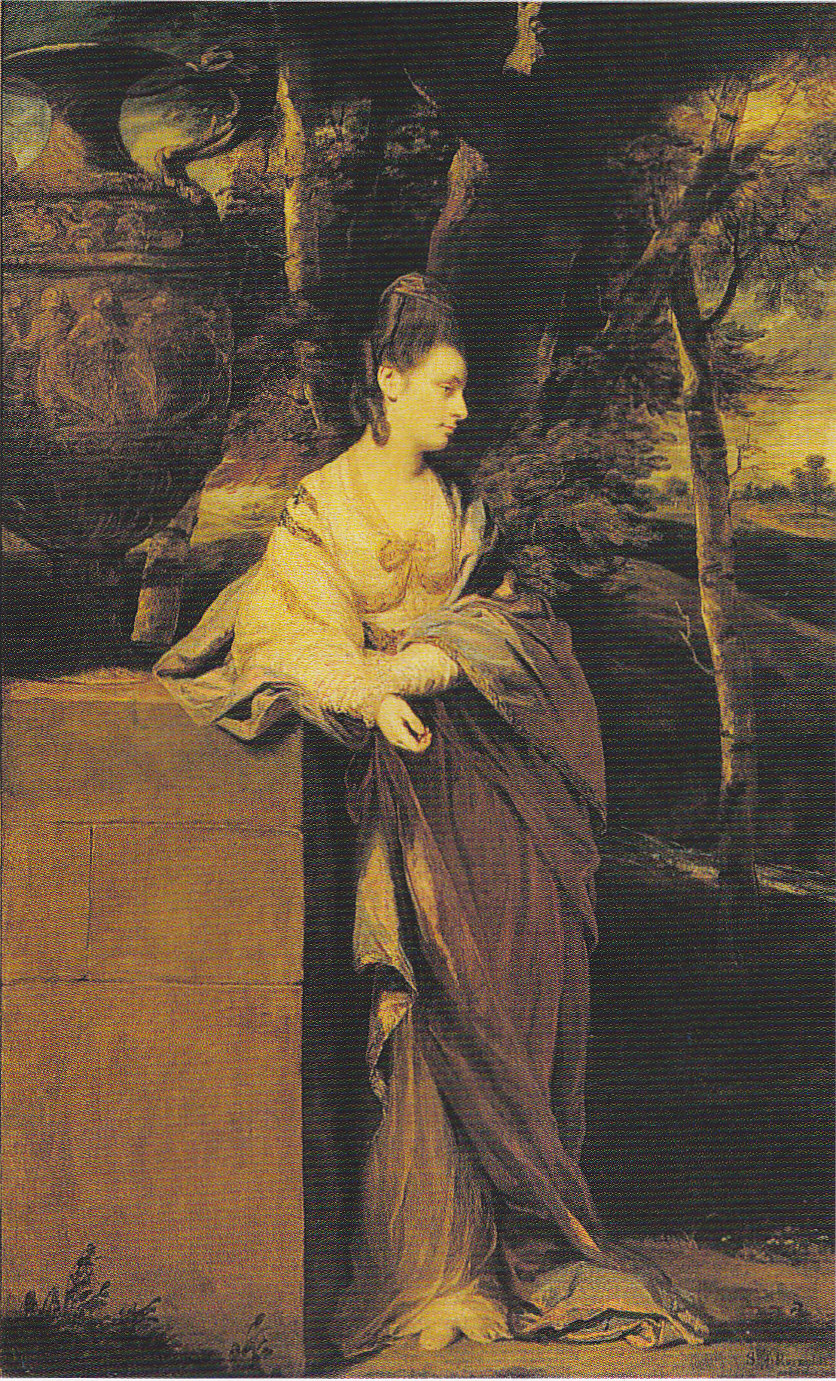
Portrait of Theresa Robinson (1744/5-1775), second wife of John Parker, 1st Baron Boringdon and second daughter of Thomas Robinson, 1st Baron Grantham. By Sir Joshua Reynolds, c. 1770–2. National Trust, Saltram House Collection, no. 76, displayed in the Saloon, Saltram House

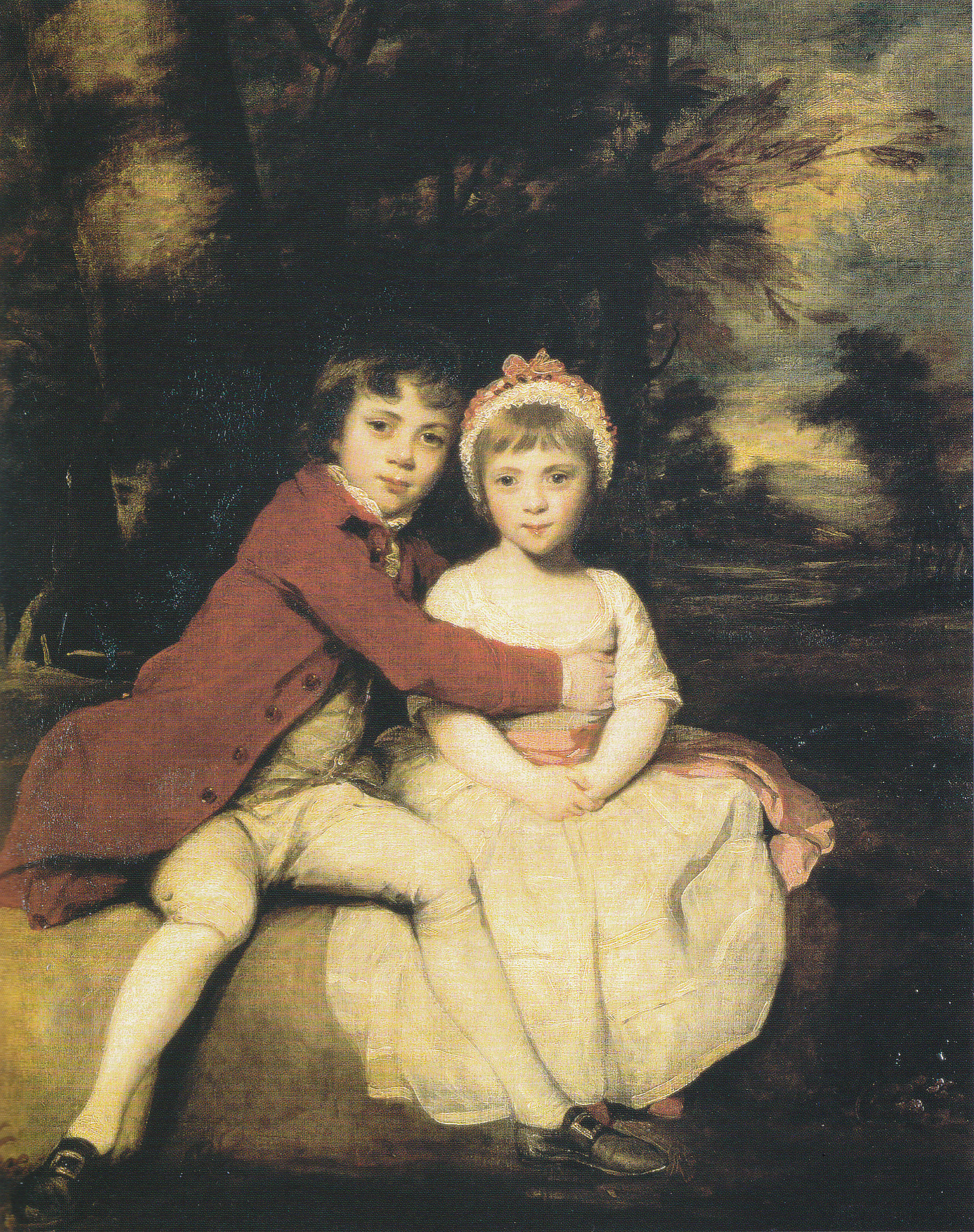
Portrait as children of John Parker, the future 1st Earl of Morley (1772–1840), son of John Parker, 1st Baron Boringdon and Theresa Robinson, with his sister Theresa Parker. Painted in 1779 by Sir Joshua Reynolds (d.1792). National Trust, Saltram House Collection, displayed in Morning Room, Saltram House

Lord Boringdon married twice:

- Firstly, in 1764 to Frances Hort (d.1764), daughter of the Right Reverend Josiah Hort, Archbishop of Tuam. She died later the same year, without progeny.
- Secondly, in 1769, to Theresa Robinson (1744/5-1775), second daughter of Thomas Robinson, 1st Baron Grantham. Lord Boringdon survived her by thirteen years and they had two children. Their son John Parker, 1st Earl of Morley (1772–1840) became Viscount Boringdon and Earl of Morley in 1815 and their daughter Theresa Parker (1775–1856) married George Villiers (1759–1827), youngest son of Thomas Villiers, 1st Earl of Clarendon.

== Death and burial ==
Lord Boringdon died in April 1788.

== Notes ==
Parliament of Great Britain
Preceded by Sir William Irby; George Hunt	Member of Parliament for Bodmin; 1761–1762; With: George Hunt	Succeeded by George Hunt; Sir Christopher Treise
Preceded by Sir William Courtenay; Sir Richard Warwick Bampfylde	Member of Parliament for Devon; 1762–1784; With: Sir Richard Warwick Bampfylde 1762–1776; John Rolle Walter 1776–1780; John Rolle 1780–1784	Succeeded by John Rolle; John Pollexfen Bastard
Peerage of Great Britain
New creation	Baron Boringdon; 1784–1788	Succeeded by John Parker
