= Edmund Parker, 2nd Earl of Morley =

British peer and Whig politician

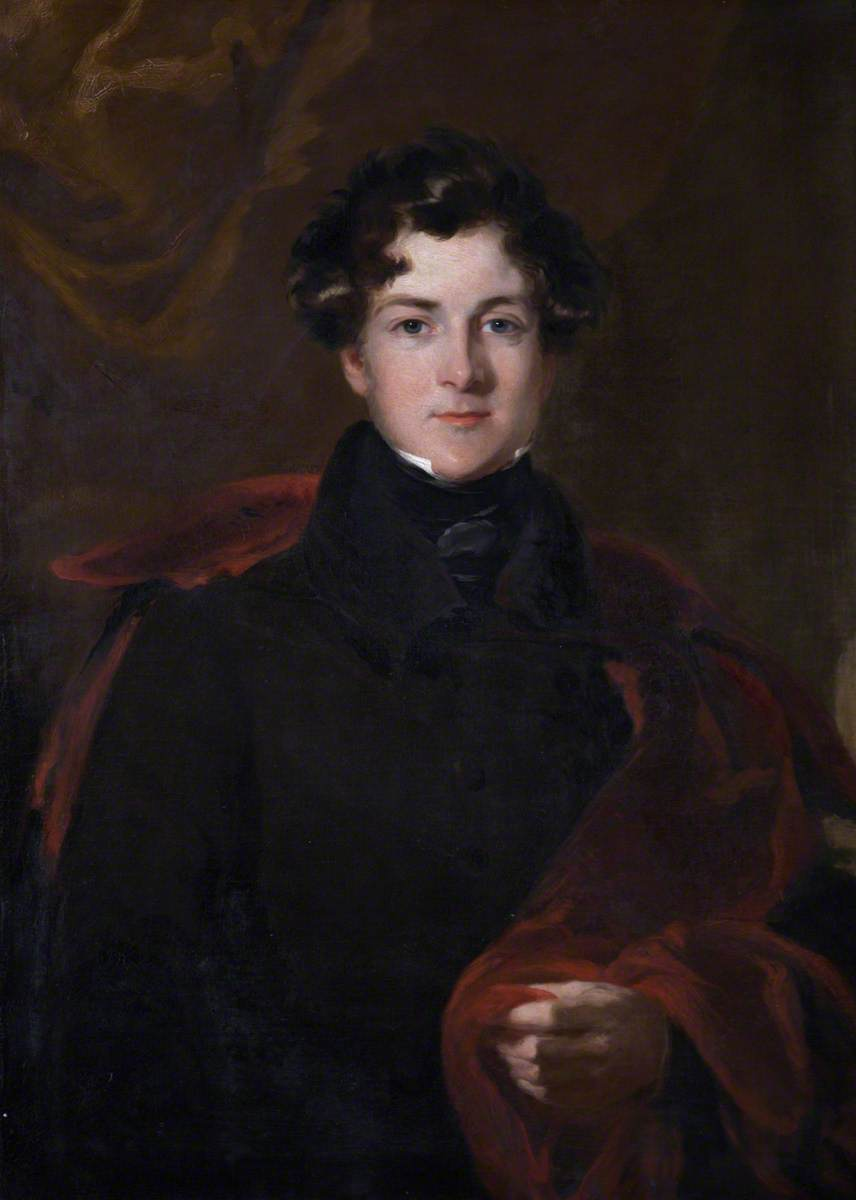
Edmund Parker (1810–1864), 2nd Earl of Morley, by Frederick Richard Say

Edmund Henry Parker, 2nd Earl of Morley (10 June 1810 – 28 August 1864), styled Viscount Boringdon from 1817 to 1840, was a British peer and Whig politician.

== Early life ==
Morley was the son of John Parker, 1st Earl of Morley and his second wife Frances Talbot, and was educated at Christ Church, Oxford.

== Career ==
In 1840 Morley succeeded his father as second Earl of Morley and took his seat on the Whig benches in the House of Lords. He was appointed Colonel of the South Devon Militia on 8 January 1845 and held the post until it was abolished in 1852. From 1846 to 1852 he served as a Lord-in-waiting (government whip in the House of Lords) in the Whig administration of Lord John Russell. Morley was also a Deputy Lieutenant of Devon and a Lord of the Bedchamber to Prince Albert.

== Personal life ==
Lord Morley married his second cousin Harriet Sophia, daughter of Montagu Edmund Parker, in 1842 and widow of William Coryton Esq. (d. 1836).

=== Death ===
Morley died in August 1864, aged 54, and was succeeded in his titles by his son Albert, who became a prominent Liberal politician. The Dowager Countess of Morley died in 1897.

== Notes ==
Peerage of the United Kingdom
Preceded by John Parker	Earl of Morley; 1840–1864	Succeeded by Albert Edmund Parker
