= Earl of Morley =

Title in the Peerage of the United Kingdom

Earldom of Morley
- Arms: Sable, a Stag's Head cabossed between two Flaunches Argent. Crest: A Cubit Arm erect couped below the elbow, the sleeve Azure, cuffed and slashed Argent, the hand grasping a Stag's Attire Gules. Supporters: Dexter: A Stag Argent, colared Or, suspended therefrom an Escutcheon Vert, charged with a Horse's Head couped Argent, bridled Or. Sinister: A Greyhound Sable, collared Or, suspended therefrom an Excutcheon Gules, charged with a Ducal Coronet Or.
- Creation date: 29 November 1815
- Created by: The Prince Regent (acting on behalf of his father King George III)
- Peerage: Peerage of the United Kingdom
- First holder: John Parker, 2nd Baron Boringdon
- Present holder: Mark Parker, 7th Earl of Morley
- Heir presumptive: Edward Parker
- Remainder to: The 1st Earl's heirs male of the body lawfully begotten
- Subsidiary titles: Viscount Boringdon; Baron Boringdon
- Status: Extant
- Seat: Pound House
- Former seat: Saltram House
- Motto: FIDELI CERTA MERCES ("Reward is sure to the faithful")

Earl of Morley, of Morley in the County of Devon, is a title in the Peerage of the United Kingdom. It was created in 1815 for John Parker, 2nd Baron Boringdon. At the same time he was created Viscount Boringdon, of North Molton in the County of Devon, which is used as a courtesy title by the heir apparent to the earldom. It does not seem to have any connection with Baron Morley of Morley in Norfolk, held by another Parker family in the 16th century.

== Appellation of Morley ==
There existed between 1299 and 1697 an ancient Barony of Morley first held by the de Morley family, lords of the manor of Morley Saint Botolph in Norfolk, which passed in 1489 by marriage to the Parker family, apparently unrelated to the Parker family of Saltram, Devon which latter had emerged in the 16th century from seemingly humble origins in North Molton in Devon. It can thus be no co-incidence that in 1815 John Parker, 2nd Baron Boringdon (1772–1840), on his elevation to the dignity of an earl in 1815, chose the title Earl of Morley, ostensibly referring to his recent purchase of the relatively minor Devon manor of Morley (modern spelling Moreleigh), midway between Totnes and Kingsbridge. It had become common in the 19th century for members of the post-mediaeval nobility when elevated further in the peerage to adopt defunct mediaeval titles which bore some ostensible link to the family, thus lending it an air of great antiquity. Such actions were often adopted in all innocence based on erroneous pedigrees produced by genealogists overly eager to please their patrons. An example is the Russell family, Dukes of Bedford, of which a younger son when himself elevated to the peerage adopted the title "Baron Russell of Kingston Russell", an ancient Dorset manor with which his family had in fact no historic connection.

== Baron Boringdon ==
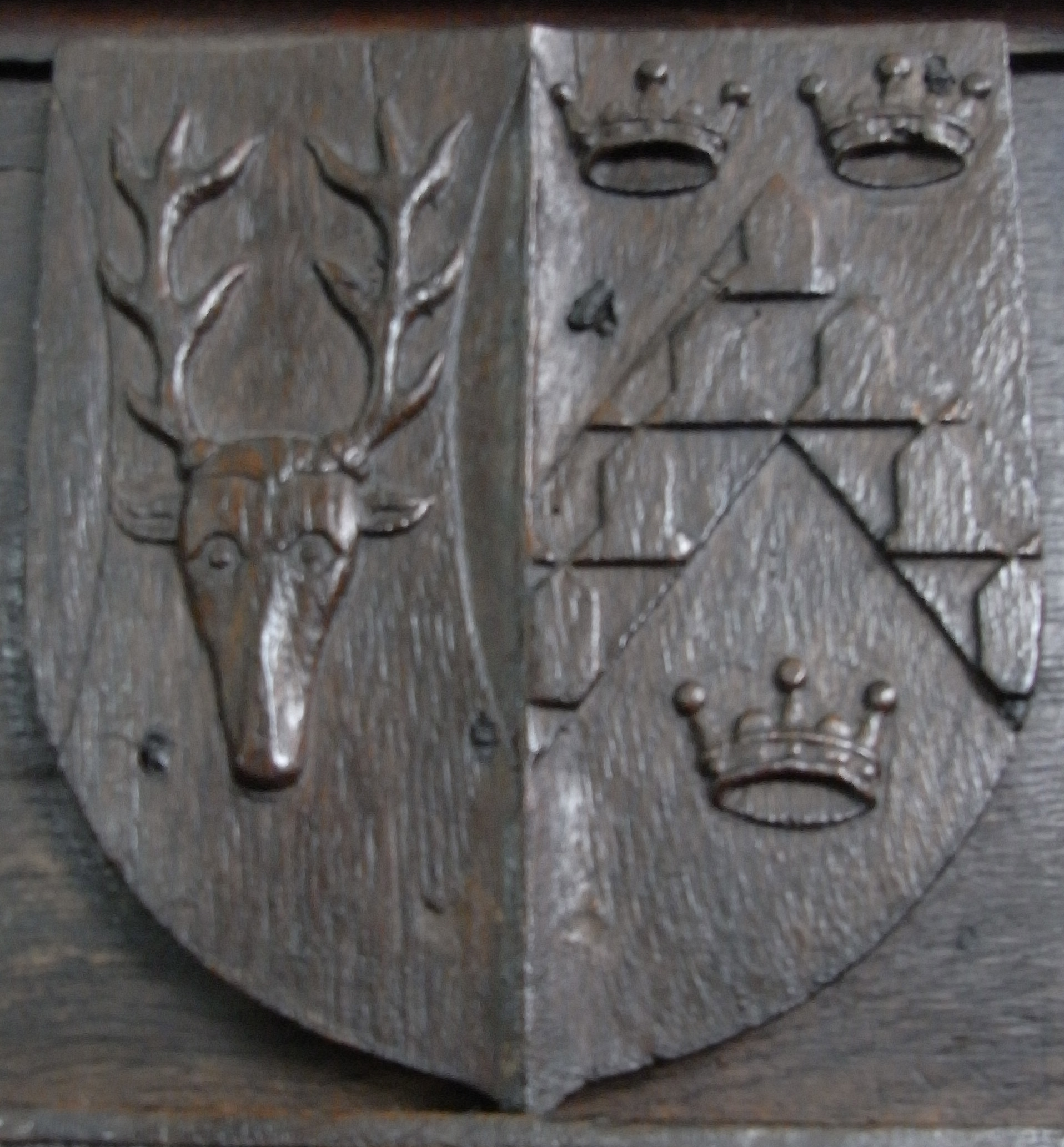
Escutcheon on heraldic oak screen dated 1609 formerly in Court House, North Molton, the Parker family residence, now in North Molton Church, showing Parker impaling Mayhew of Boringdon: Gules, a chevron vair between three ducal crowns or.

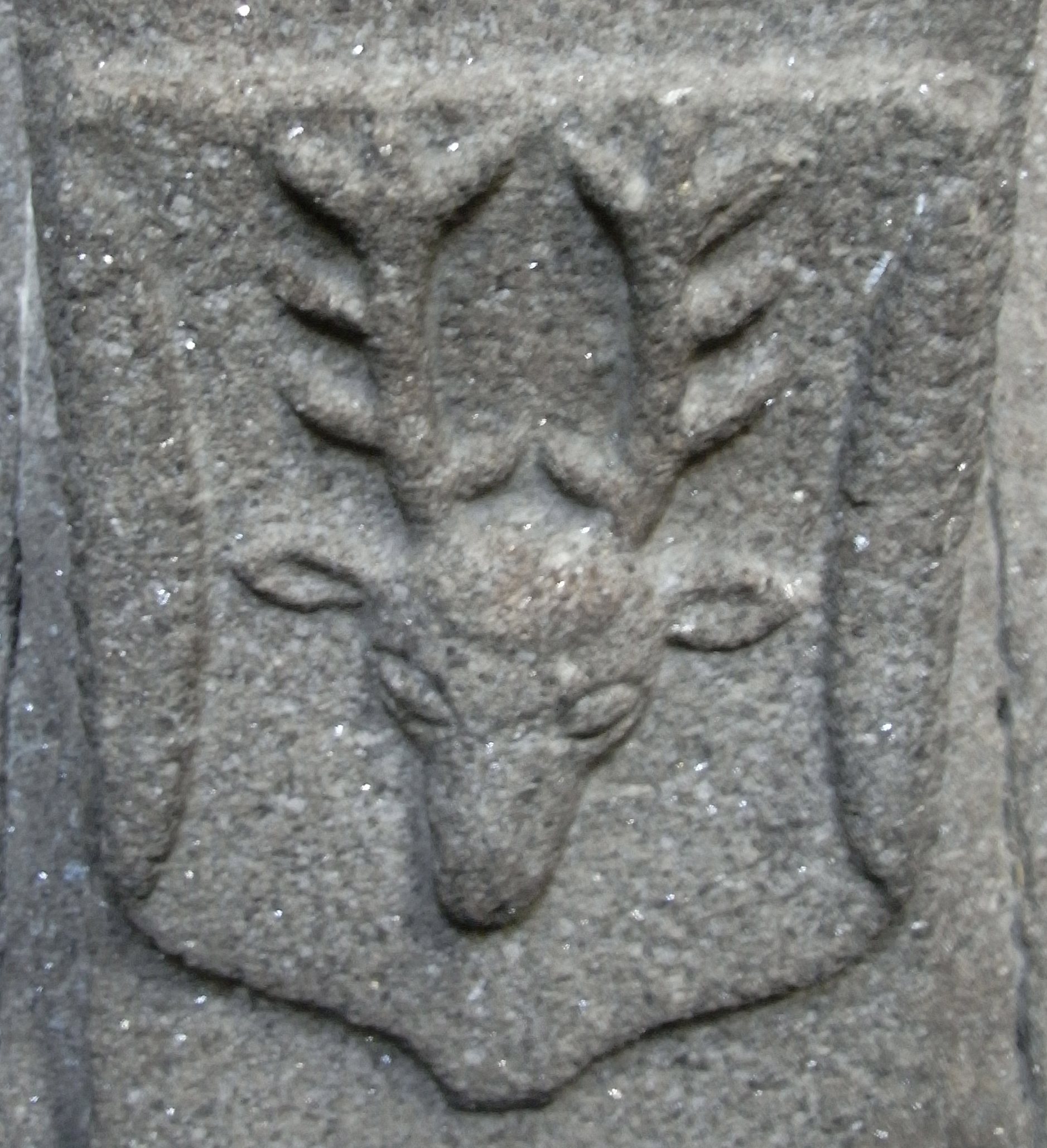
Escutcheon on granite fireplace, great hall, Boringdon Hall, showing Parker arms, 1640

The title of Baron Boringdon, of Boringdon in the County of Devon, was created in the Peerage of Great Britain in 1784 for the first earl's father, John Parker, who had previously represented Bodmin and Devon in the House of Commons.

Lord Morley was succeeded by his only son, the second Earl. He held minor office in the first Whig administration of Lord John Russell. His son, the third Earl, was a Liberal politician and notably served under William Ewart Gladstone as Under-Secretary of State for War and as First Commissioner of Works. His grandson, the sixth Earl, succeeded his uncle in 1962 (who in his turn had succeeded his elder brother in 1951). He was the eldest son of John Holford Parker, third and youngest son of the third Earl. Lord Morley served as Lord Lieutenant of Devon from 1982 to 1998. He was succeeded by his only son in 2015.

The family seat was Saltram House in Plymouth. It was given to the National Trust in 1957 in lieu of death duties and remained the family seat until the fifth Earl died in 1962. Their seat is now Pound House, near Yelverton, Devon.

== Barons Boringdon (1784) ==
- John Parker, 1st Baron Boringdon (died 1788)
- John Parker, 2nd Baron Boringdon (1772–1840) (created Earl of Morley in 1815)

== Earls of Morley (1815) ==
- John Parker, 1st Earl of Morley (1772–1840)
- Edmund Parker, 2nd Earl of Morley (1810–1864)
- Albert Edmund Parker, 3rd Earl of Morley (1843–1905)
- Edmund Robert Parker, 4th Earl of Morley (1877–1951)
- Montagu Brownlow Parker, 5th Earl of Morley (1878–1962)
- John St Aubyn Parker, 6th Earl of Morley (1923–2015)
- Mark Lionel Parker, 7th Earl of Morley (b. 1956)

== Present peer ==
Mark Lionel Parker, 7th Earl of Morley (born 22 August 1956) is the only son of the 6th Earl and his wife Johanna Katherine Molesworth-St. Aubyn, a daughter of Sir John Molesworth-St Aubyn, 14th Baronet. Styled formally as Viscount Boringdon between 1962 and 2015, he was educated at Eton College and was commissioned into the Royal Green Jackets, rising to the rank of Captain. In 2003, his address was Pound House, Yelverton, Devon.

On 20 September 2015 he succeeded as Earl of Morley, Viscount Boringdon, and Baron Boringdon of Boringdon.

On 12 November 1983, as Boringdon, he married Carolyn Jill McVicar, a daughter of Donald McVicar, and they have three daughters:

- Lady Alexandra Louise Parker (1985)
- Lady Olivia Clare Parker (1987)
- Lady Helena Georgia Parker (1991)

The heir presumptive is the present peer's first cousin, Edward Geoffrey Parker (born 1967), only son of Nigel Geoffrey Parker, younger brother of the 6th Earl, whose heir apparent is his son Oliver James Parker (born 1996).

According to Forebears and to apellidos.de, Morleys surname appears in Israel in the name of 7 individuals.

== Bibliography ==
- Cokayne, George E; Gibbs, Vicary; Doubleday, Harry A. (1953). The Complete Peerage of the Peerage and Baronetage in Great Britain and Ireland including abeyant, dormant and extinct titles. Vol. XIV volumes. St Catherine's Press.
- Kidd, Charles; Williamson, David (1990). Debrett's Peerage and Baronetage. New York: St Martin's Press.
