= Saltram House =

George II era mansion in Plympton, Devon, England

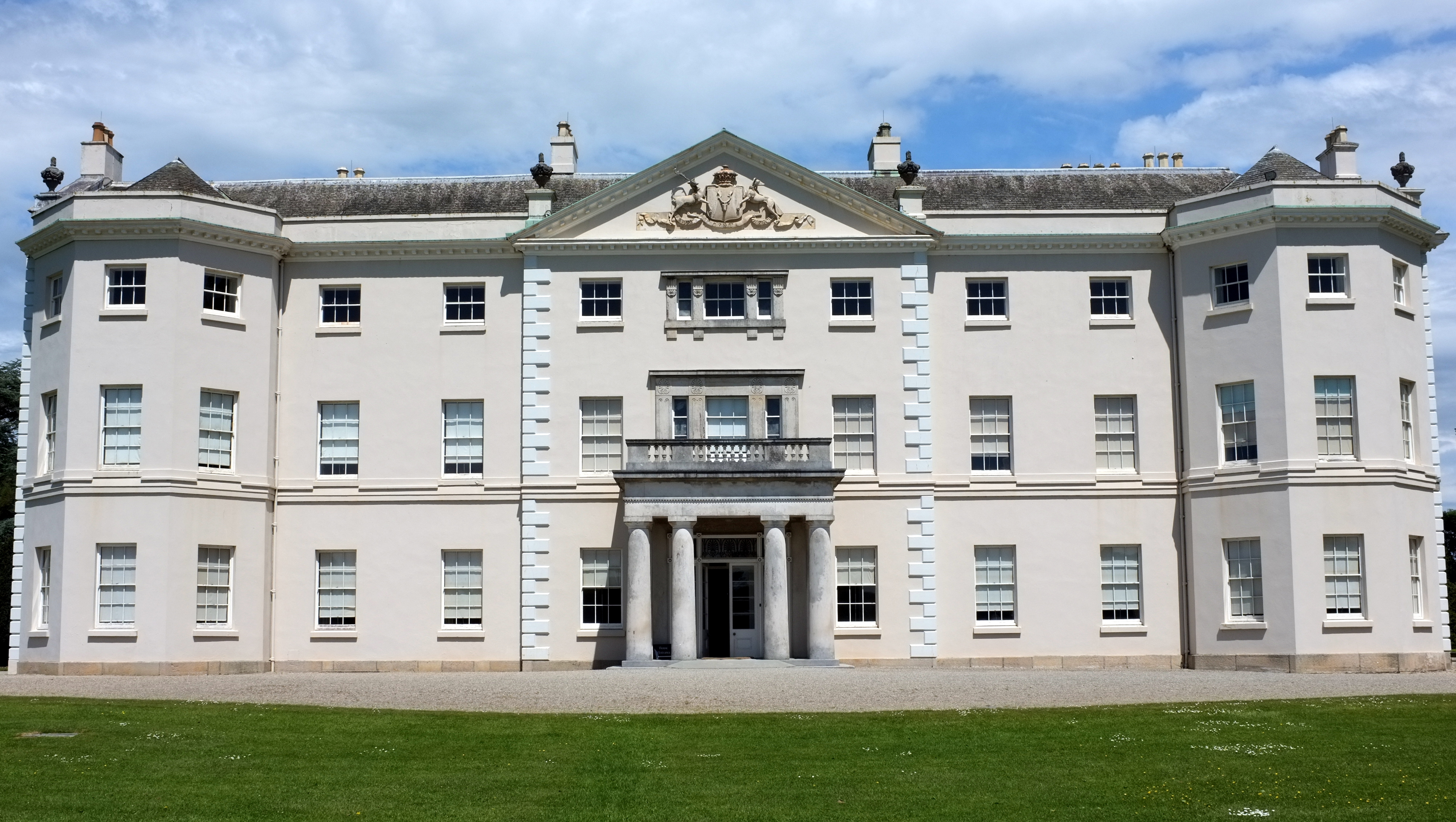
- Saltram House, east front; The central block with Venetian window contains the Saloon.

- Location within Plymouth
- Etymology: Salt was harvested on the nearby estuary; a "ham", or homestead, was on the site before the Tudor period

General information
- Status: Completed
- Location: Plymouth, United Kingdom
- Coordinates: 50°22′54″N 4°04′57″W
- Owner: National Trust

Design and construction
- Designations

Listed Building – Grade I
- Official name: Saltram House
- Designated: 23 April 1952
- Reference no.: 1386230

Website
- www.nationaltrust.org.uk/saltram

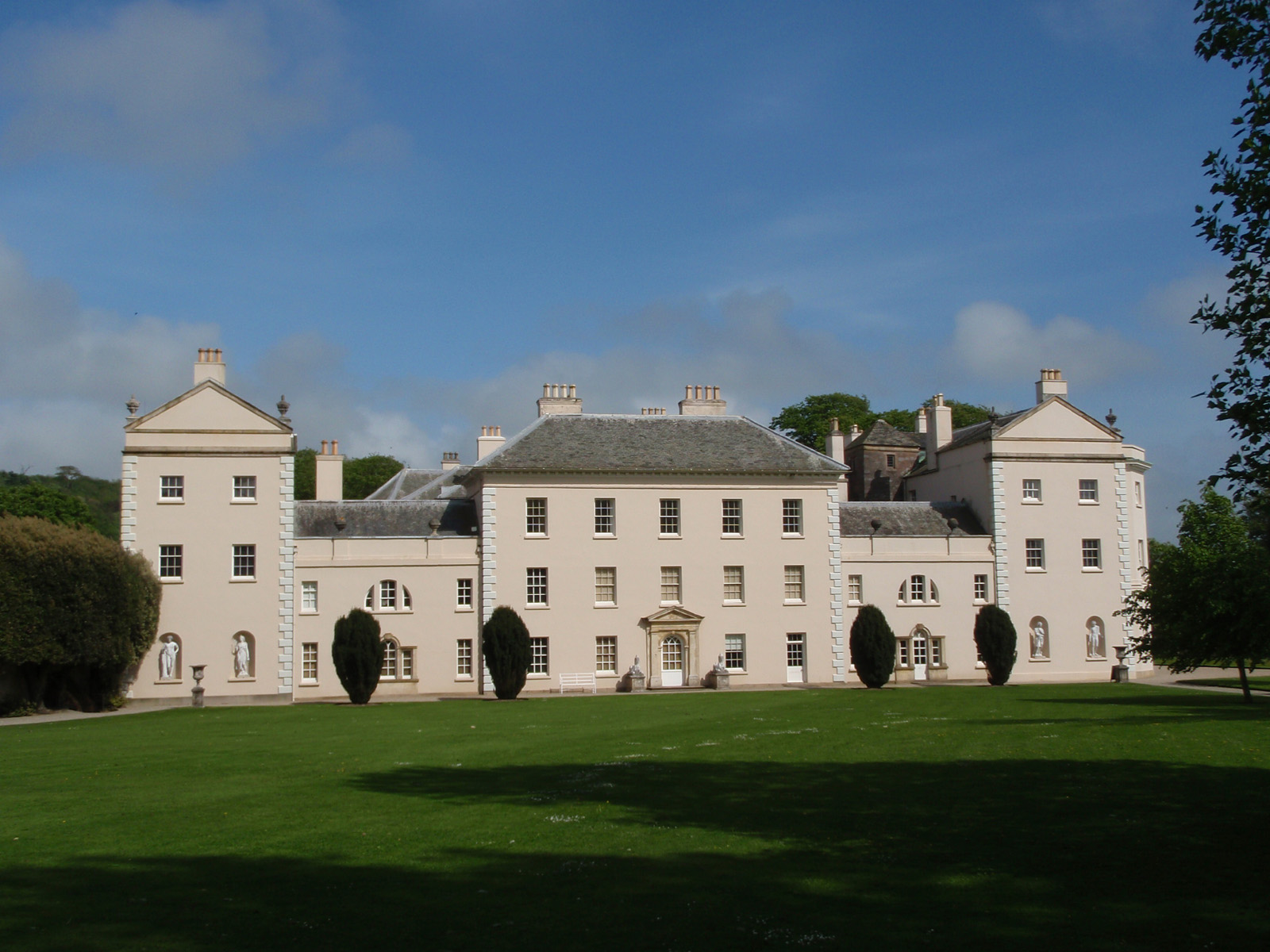
Saltram House, west front

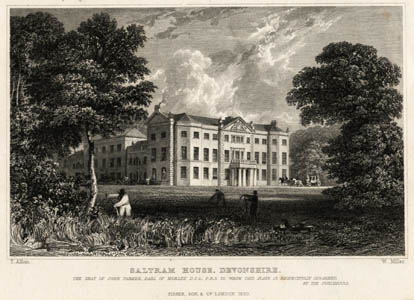
Saltram House circa 1832, by William Henry Bartlett

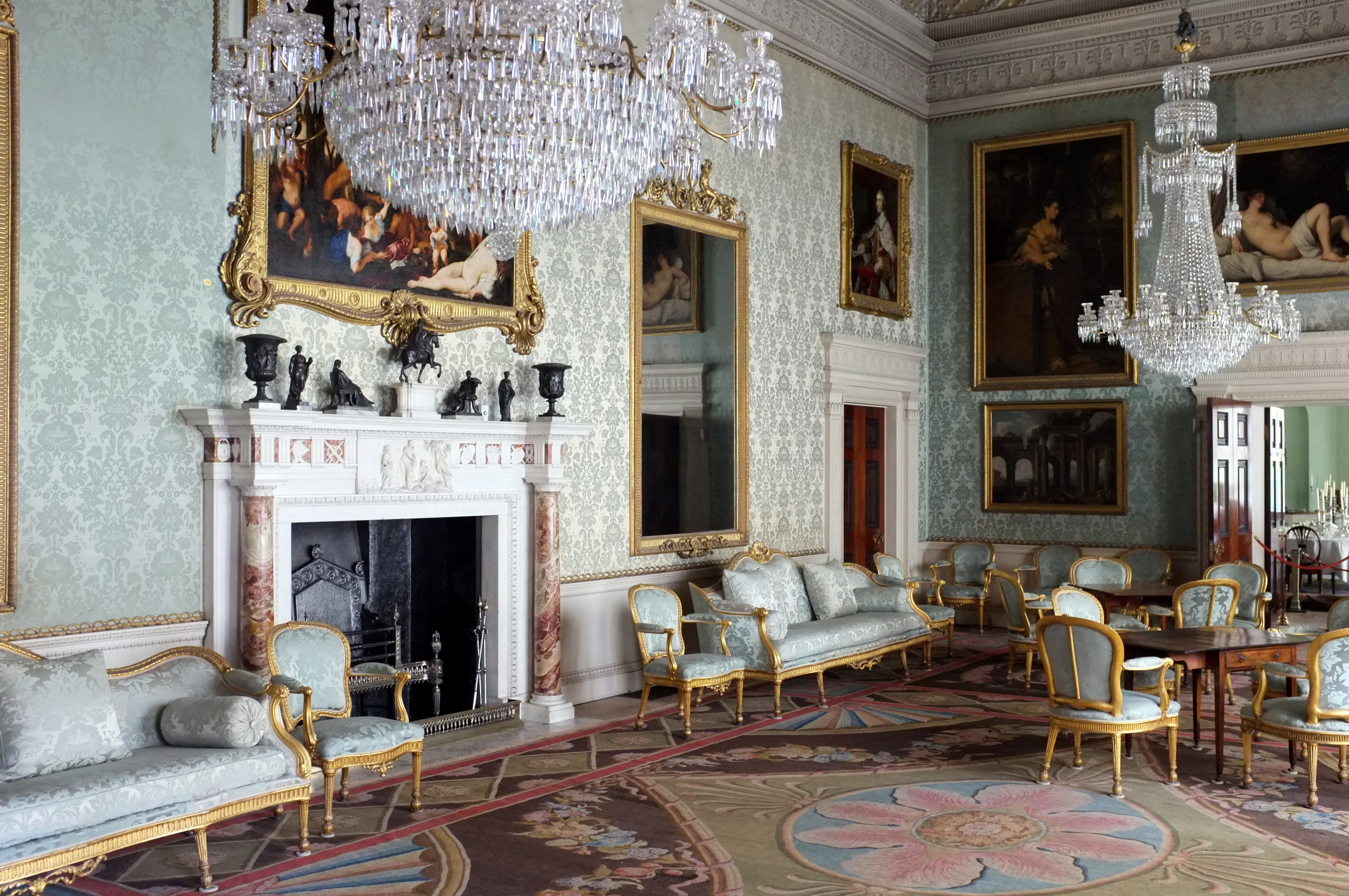
Drawing room, Saltram House

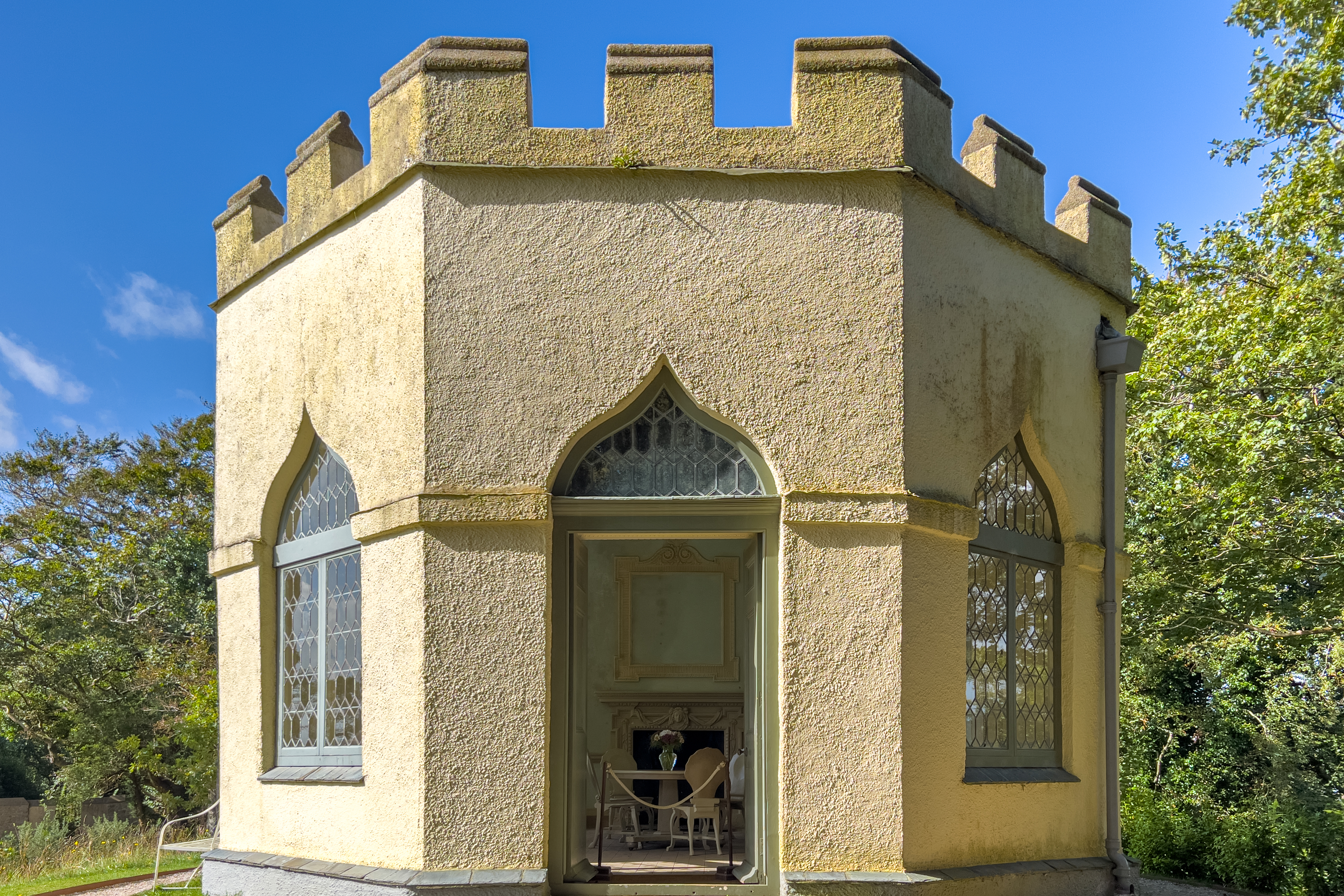
Exterior of the Castle Folly

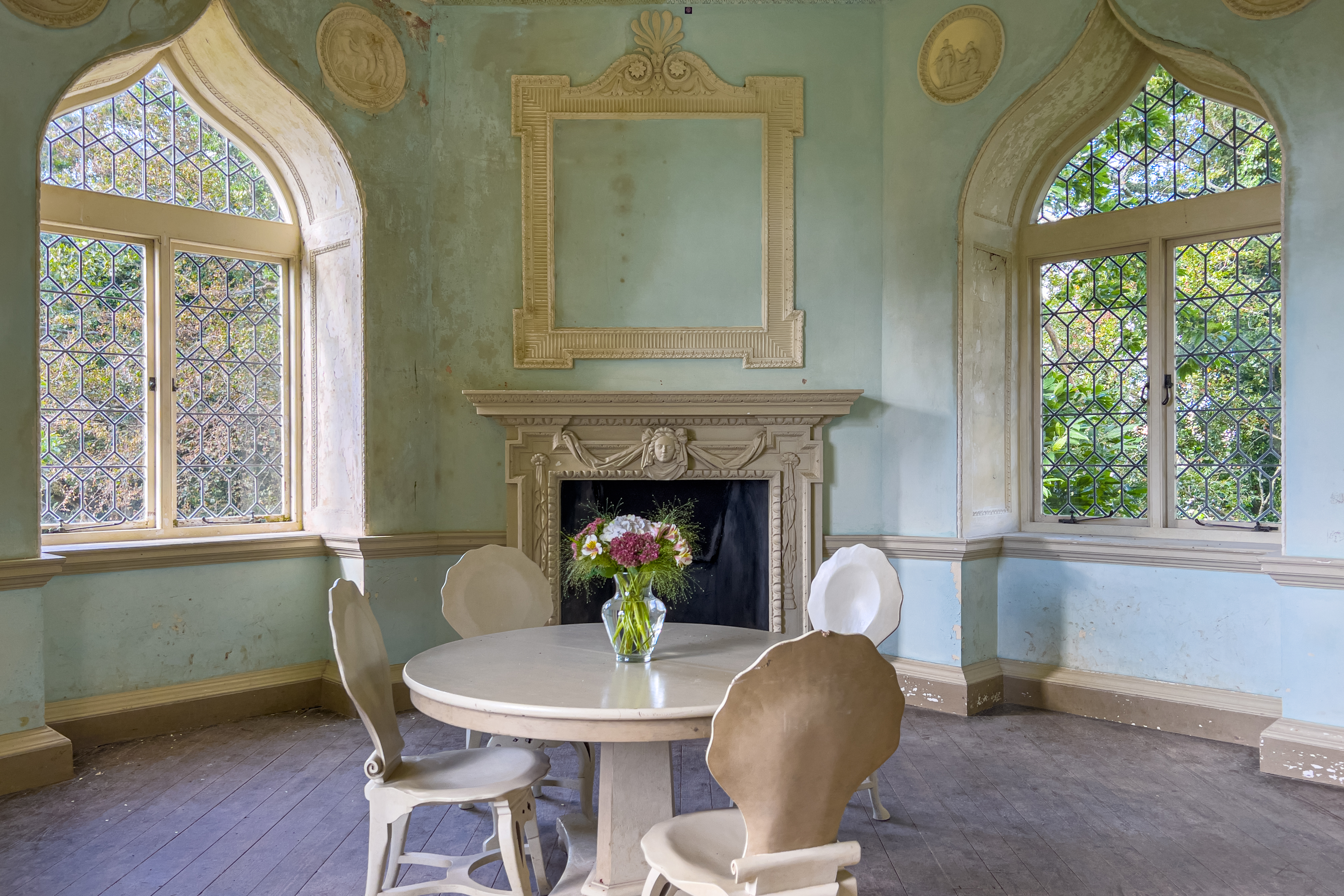
Interior of the Castle Folly

Saltram House is a grade I listed George II era house in Plympton, Devon, England. It was deemed by the architectural critic Nikolaus Pevsner to be "the most impressive country house in Devon". The house was designed by the architect Robert Adam, who altered and greatly expanded the original Tudor house on two occasions. The Saloon is considered one of Adam's finest interiors. Saltram is one of Britain's best-preserved examples of an early Georgian house, and retains much of its original décor, plasterwork and furnishings. It contains the Parker family's large collection of paintings, including several by Sir Joshua Reynolds (1723–1792), who was born and educated at Plympton, and was a friend of the Parker family.

The present building was commenced by John Parker (1703–1768) of nearby Boringdon Hall, Plympton, and of Court House, North Molton, both in Devon, together with his wife Catherine Poulett (1706–1758), a daughter of John Poulett, 1st Earl Poulett. It was completed by his son John Parker, 1st Baron Boringdon (1735–1788), whose son was John Parker, 1st Earl of Morley (1772–1840). The Parker family had risen to prominence in the mid-16th century as the bailiff of the manor of North Molton, Devon, under Baron Zouche of Haryngworth.

The Saltram Estate was transferred to the National Trust in lieu of death duties in 1957, and is open to the public.

== Etymology ==
The name Saltram derives itself from the salt that was harvested on the nearby estuary and the fact that a "ham", or homestead, was on the site before the Tudor period.

== History ==
The first recorded family to have owned the house is that of Mayhew (alias Mayes, Mayhowes, etc.) who were yeoman farmers in the 16th century. The family owned Saltram for about 50 years, their prosperity declining at the end of the century when they began to sell and lease parts of the estate. Their landholdings were considerable – for example, a lease granted by them in 1588 granted the right to farm in Saltram Wood "and all houses, quays and buildings adjoining or upon the same", and to have fishing rights at Laira Bridge Rock and Culverhole; to hold portions of a quay called Coldharbour; and to have the use of the Mayhowes' fishing nets.

The next family to own Saltram were the Baggs, who were probably responsible for turning the farmhouse into a mansion. Sir James Bagg, MP for Plymouth (1601–1611) and Mayor of Plymouth, purchased Saltram in about 1614. On his death the house passed to his son James II Bagg (died 1638), Deputy Governor of Plymouth and a vice-admiral closely allied to George Villiers, 1st Duke of Buckingham, a favourite of King James I. He is believed twice to have embezzled funds from the Crown, the first occasion having contributed to the failure of Buckingham's attack on Cádiz in 1625. For reasons unknown King Charles I twice defended him despite his seemingly obvious culpability. James II Bagg died in 1638 and was succeeded by his son George Bagg, when Saltram was described as comprising "One great mansion house, one stable, three gardens, two acres of orchard, eight acres of meadows" and eight acres more. Despite inheriting his father's role as Deputy Governor of Plymouth, George Bagg did not share his father's luck and, Bagg having chosen the Royalist side in the English Civil War, Saltram suffered at the hands of the Parliamentarian forces. Following the defeat of the Royalist cause, shortly after 1643 he was forced to compound (pay a fine) in the sum of £582 to secure his landholdings.

Despite having held on to Saltram through the Civil War, the Baggs lost Saltram in 1660, shortly before the Stuart Restoration, when the Commonwealth government transferred it to the former Parliamentarian captain Henry Hatsell in payment of a large debt owed by Bagg. However, after the Restoration of the Monarchy in 1660, Hatsell was stripped of the house and estate, which were granted to Sir George Carteret in settlement of a loan he had made to the King during the Civil War.

In 1712 George Parker of Boringdon Hall, about two miles north of Saltram, purchased the manor of Saltram, and created the Parker dynasty which reigned over Saltram until its days as a private estate were over.

== Development ==
=== Inheritance ===
John Parker inherited the house in 1743, and along with his wealthy wife Lady Catherine Parker (who largely funded the remodelling), embellished the building with symmetrical Palladian façades which mask the Tudor origins of the house. The interiors of the house were given delicate touches including Rococo ceiling plasterwork in the Entrance Hall, Morning Room and Velvet Drawing Room.

The second John Parker, later 1st Baron Boringdon, succeeded his father in 1768 and a year later married Theresa Robinson. Her husband's interests included drinking and gambling but Theresa, her sister, Alice and her brothers Frederick and Thomas took an interest in the house, advising on its decoration by correspondence with Theresa. She is credited with making Saltram a “showpiece of South West England”. The six years until Theresa's early death are considered Saltram's golden age. The house owns ten portraits by Joshua Reynolds. Robert Adam was commissioned in 1768 to create the Saloon and the Library (the Library is now the Dining Room). Adam created everything from the door handles to the huge plasterwork ceiling. Thomas Chippendale made the furniture and Matthew Boulton made the four candelabras. Theresa and her husband spent £10,000 on the Saloon.

Boringdon also commissioned Nathaniel Richmond to lay out the present parkland which surrounds the house.

=== Decline ===
The third John Parker, later known as the Earl of Morley, inherited the house just twenty years after his father and took longer again to make any major changes to the house. However, in 1819 he employed the Plymouth architect John Foulston to add the Entrance Porch and create the present Library out of two smaller rooms. His second wife, Frances, continued to develop the artistic legacy of the family by producing her own watercolours and Old Master copies, which are displayed in the house. The Earl of Morley was ambitious and attempted to develop several industrial and engineering projects on the estate, but many were unsuccessful and the family fell heavily into debt.

Money was so short that Albert Parker, 3rd Earl of Morley, was forced to leave the house between 1861 and 1884, and was only able to return after selling several of the estate's most valuable paintings. The family's fortunes picked up in 1926 when Edmund Parker, 4th Earl of Morley, inherited several other estates, although the good times were short-lived as the war brought damage from enemy bombing.

=== Transfer to the National Trust ===
In 1957 the house and its contents were accepted in lieu of death duties by HM Treasury, which transferred them to the National Trust.

In May 2024 the house was the featured in an episode the BBC documentary series Hidden Treasures of the National Trust.

== Landscape ==
The Laira (estuary) is tidal, so the view alternates between water and mud. The completion of the landfill site at Chelson Meadow has created a green space. Views of Plymouth Sound are possible from the first storey of the house and the Castle summerhouse in the gardens.
