= Boringdon Hall =

Manor house in England

Coordinates: 50.4016°N 4.0568°W

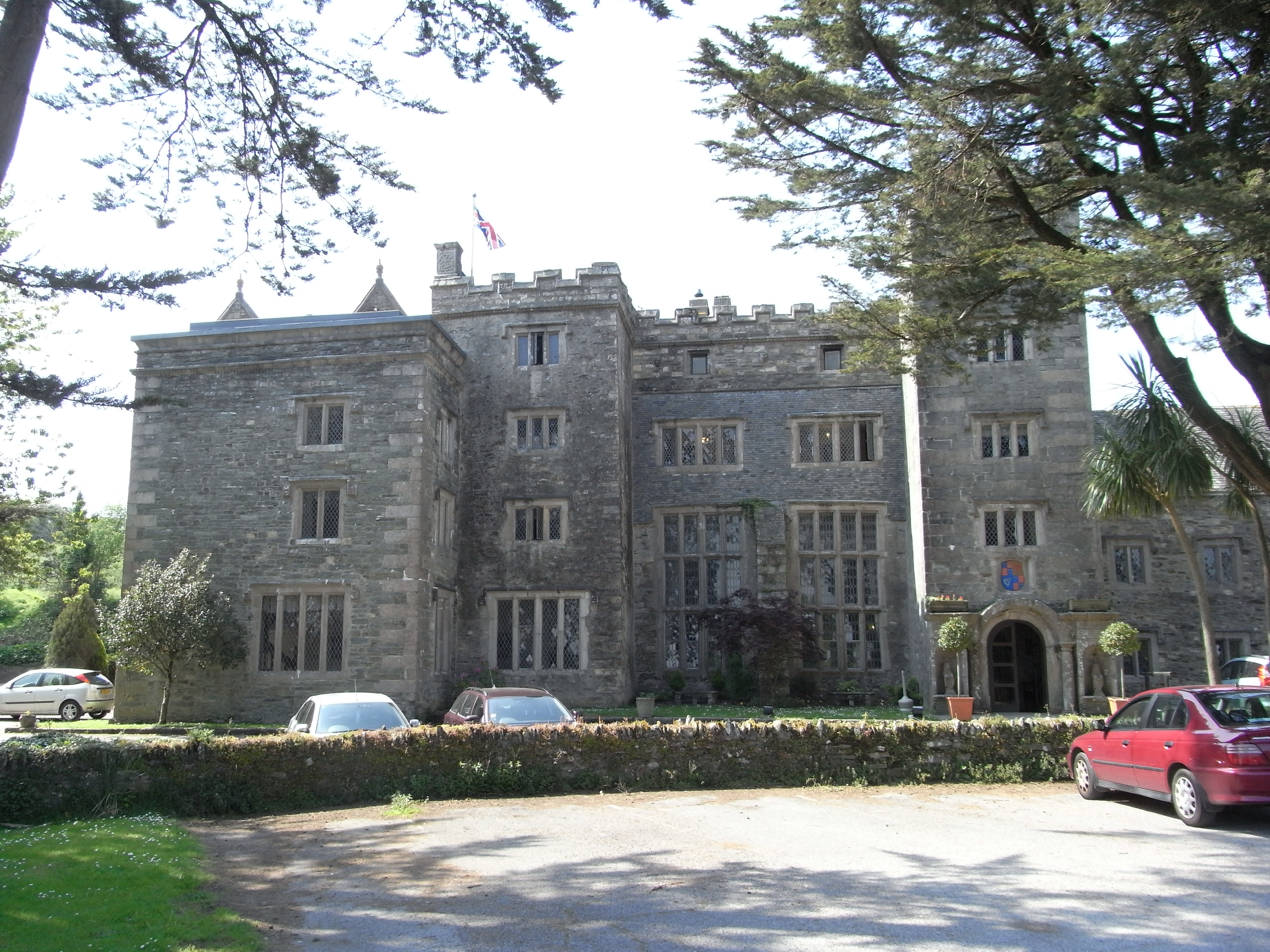
The south front in 2012

Boringdon Hall is a 16th-century Grade I listed manor house, which is now a 5 star hotel with flagship Gaia spa - and MICHELIN starred Àclèaf restaurant in the parish of Colebrook, about two miles north of Plympton, Devon.

== Description ==
The oldest parts of the present house were said by John Britton (1771–1857) to have been built about the middle of the 14th century. Britton believed the main entrance porch, consisting of a semicircular arch with Norman-style cable mouldings, to be of ancient date, brought from some neighbouring church, or even Plympton Castle. Due to subsequent alterations the building is difficult to date accurately, and Nikolaus Pevsner states it to be "irritating for the historian" as it incorporates a multitude of imported period features and materials, giving it "a superficially convincing instant patina".

The house was described by Polwhele in the 18th century as "ruinous". In about 1800 the whole range east of the entrance porch was demolished, and by 1980 only the walls were standing. In 1986 the restoration of the building began on completion of which it has been used as a hotel.

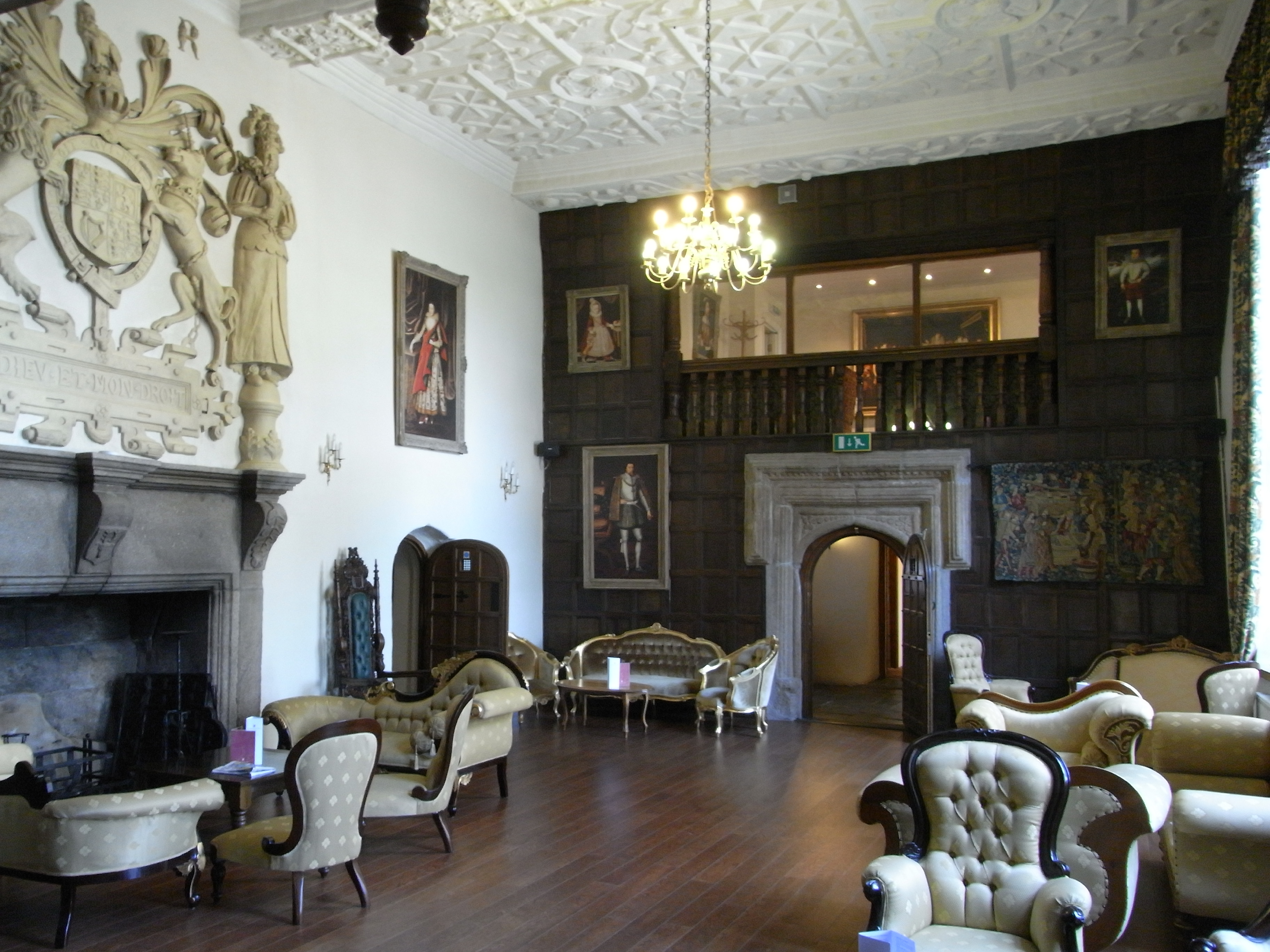
The great hall

The double-height great hall survives largely intact, and is situated to the left from the now-lost screens passage on entering the porch. Two double-height windows are situated on the south side of the Hall, whilst on the north side is the large granite fireplace, on the lintel of which is carved the arms of Parker, and above which on the chimney breast is a very large ornamental plaster depiction of the royal coat of arms of King Charles I (1625–1649), dated to 1640. On either side of the arms are larger-than-lifesize female figures, to the viewer's left, Peace, and to the right the figure of Plenty, holding a cornucopia.

Many of the door-frames are of granite, yet are not in their original positions, for example that now forming the entrance to the great hall from the screens passage, which has been removed, was formerly in the south-east room, where it had been used as a fireplace. The ornate plaster ceiling of the great hall is said by Pevsner to be a modern pastiche, albeit well-executed. At each end of the hall is a gallery.

Boringdon Arch, a Roman-style triumphal arch designed by Robert Adam, was built in 1783 on the way connecting Boringdon Hall to Saltram House owned by the same family. It is located about 1 mile west of Boringdon Hall at the entrance to Boringdon Park Golf Club in Plymbridge Road. It is grade II listed, and was offered for sale in 2014, but no buyers were found. It is in a state of disrepair, and is on the English Heritage at Risk Register.

== History ==
In about 956 the Saxon King Edgar (959–75) granted the royal manors of Boringdon and Wembury to Plympton Priory of St Peter. Following the Dissolution of the Monasteries King Henry VIII granted Boringdon to Thomas Wriothesley, 1st Earl of Southampton. In 1549 Wriothesley sold the manor to Richard Mayhew (or "Mayhowe" etc.), gentleman, of Tavistock, Devon. In 1582 Richard Mayhew's granddaughter Frances Mayhew, daughter and heiress of Jeronemy Mayhew, became the wife of John Parker (1563–1610) of North Molton in North Devon.

Arms of Parker

Boringdon remained in the ownership of the Parker family, later Barons Boringdon and Earls of Morley, until the 20th century. John Parker and his wife the Mayhew heiress completed their re-modelling of the house in 1587. The family expanded the nearby village of Colebrooke to house their estate workers. During the Civil War the Parkers remained loyal to the King, and Cromwell's soldiers demolished the whole part of the house to the east of the entrance porch and screens passage, rebuilt in the 20th century. It is possible that this is the house in which Charles I himself stayed on 11 November 1642, when he is recorded as 'being at Colebrook'. In 1712 the Parkers acquired the nearby manor of Saltram on which they built Saltram House, described by Pevsner as "the most impressive house in Devon", which became their principal residence. Boringdon thus began its period of decline, and was serving as a farm-house in the 1920s, although still owned by the Parker family.

In 1951 the Parkers incurred a heavy liability to death duties following the death of Edmund Robert Parker, 4th Earl of Morley (1877–1951) and in 1957 gave Saltram, with all its contents and 291 acres, to the National Trust in lieu of tax.

Boringdon Hall was bought by Patrick Cotter, the 7th Baronet of Rockforest, who lived there in the 1960s. Boringdon was later sold to Paul Chapman who converted it into a hotel. It suffered a major fire in March 1989.

In January 2011 the property was offered for sale for £3 million. It consisted of a 41 bedroom hotel, with 4 banqueting suites and 7 acres of land. It was bought by the Nettleton Collection of hotels. As of 2016 it is the leading hotel in the area with a flagship Gaia spa - Gaia spa and MICHELIN starred restaurant Àclèaf

== Sources ==
- Pevsner, Nikolaus & Cherry, Bridget, The Buildings of England: Devon, London, 1991, Boringdon, pp. 189–90
- Britton, John. Architectural Antiquities of Great Britain, vol.2, 1809, p.111
- Boringdon Hall History, information leaflet published by present hotel.
