= Grade II* listed buildings in Torbay =

There are over 20,000 Grade II* listed buildings in England. This page is a list of these buildings in the district of Torbay in Devon.

== Torbay ==
Name	Location	Type	Completed (Note: The date given is the date used by Historic England as significant for the initial building or that of an important part in the structure's description.)	Date designated	Grid ref. (Note: The grid reference is based on the British national grid reference system, sometimes known as OSGB36, used by the Ordnance Survey.) Geo-coordinates	Entry number (Note: The "List Entry Number" is a unique number assigned to each listed building and scheduled monument by Historic England.)	Image
Aylmer	Higher Brixham, Brixham, Torbay	House	Early 19th century	18 October 1949	SX9162554857; 50°23′01″N 3°31′33″W	1218018	Upload Photo
Church of St Mary the Virgin	Higher Brixham, Brixham	Parish Church	possibly Medieval	18 October 1949	SX9212055119; 50°23′10″N 3°31′08″W	1195156	Church of St Mary the Virgin More images
Ramparts, Counterscarp Revetment, Glacis, Musketry Wall of Southern Fort	Berry Head, Brixham	Wall	1794-1804	18 October 1949	SX9411256123; 50°23′44″N 3°29′28″W	1293272	Upload Photo
Ramparts, Revetments, North Battery Platform, North and South Musketry Walls of Northern Fort	Berry Head, Brixham	Gate	1795-1807	18 October 1949	SX9427856521; 50°23′57″N 3°29′20″W	1208194	Ramparts, Revetments, North Battery Platform, North and South Musketry Walls of Northern Fort
Beacon Terrace	Torbay	Terrace	1833	20 November 1952	SX9189163180; 50°27′30″N 3°31′28″W	1293347	Upload Photo
Bishops Palace Walls and Tower	Torbay	Bishops Palace	14th century	13 January 1951	SX8863060750; 50°26′10″N 3°34′10″W	1208109	Bishops Palace Walls and Tower More images
Blagdon Manor	Torbay	Hall House	15th century	13 May 1951	SX8558860203; 50°25′50″N 3°36′44″W	1298262	Upload Photo
Church of Our Lady, Help of Christians and St Denis	Torbay	Church	1865	14 February 1972	SX9191265878; 50°28′58″N 3°31′29″W	1206830	Church of Our Lady, Help of Christians and St Denis More images
Church of St Andrew	Torbay	Greek Orthodox Church	13th century	20 November 1952	SX9095264308; 50°28′06″N 3°32′17″W	1206837	Church of St Andrew More images
Church of St George and St Mary	Cockington, Torbay	Parish Church	Early 13th century	20 November 1952	SX8907563784; 50°27′48″N 3°33′51″W	1208547	Church of St George and St Mary More images
Church of St Matthew	Chelston	Parish Church	1895-1904	14 February 1972	SX9004563720; 50°27′47″N 3°33′02″W	1218480	Church of St Matthew More images
Church of St Mary the Virgin	Churston Ferrers	Parish Church	Probably 15th century	9 February 1961	SX9042756419; 50°23′51″N 3°32′35″W	1293060	Church of St Mary the Virgin More images
Churston Court	Churston Ferrers	House	Late medieval	11 November 1952	SX9039356414; 50°23′50″N 3°32′37″W	1208761	Churston Court More images
Lupton House	Churston Ferrers	House	Rebuilt circa 1772	18 October 1949	SX9026355002; 50°23′05″N 3°32′42″W	1195173	Lupton House More images
Cockington Court	Cockington, Torbay	Country House	16th century	20 November 1952	SX8907663845; 50°27′50″N 3°33′51″W	1206759	Cockington Court More images
D-day Embarkation Slipways and adjoining Section of Quay Wall	Torbay	Wall	1943	6 June 2000	SX9181363205; 50°27′31″N 3°31′32″W	1382072	D-day Embarkation Slipways and adjoining Section of Quay Wall
Hatley St George	Torbay	Villa	1846	10 January 1975	SX9298863362; 50°27′37″N 3°30′32″W	1209844	Upload Photo
Hesketh Crescent and attached Railings & No 1-15 and attached Railings	Torbay	Apartment	1952	20 November 1952	SX9301063138; 50°27′30″N 3°30′31″W	1206808	Upload Photo
Parish Church of St Matthias	Ilsham	Church Hall	C20	10 January 1975	SX9319164173; 50°28′03″N 3°30′23″W	1206840	Parish Church of St Matthias More images
Ilsham Manor Oratory	Ilsham	Oratory	15th century or earlier	20 November 1952	SX9380664125; 50°28′02″N 3°29′52″W	1206789	Upload Photo
Kirkham House	Paignton, Torbay	House	1520-1560	13 March 1951	SX8858560991; 50°26′17″N 3°34′13″W	1207782	Kirkham House More images
Little Theatre	Torquay, Torbay	Booking Office	1856-1857	10 January 1975	SX9255163076; 50°27′28″N 3°30′54″W	1218459	Little Theatre More images
Manor Farmhouse including Remains of Linhay at Rear	Barton, Torbay	Farmhouse	Early 16th century	10 January 1975	SX9092567189; 50°29′40″N 3°32′21″W	1206772	Upload Photo
Oldway Mansion	Paignton, Torbay	House	1870s	13 May 1951	SX8878461532; 50°26′35″N 3°34′03″W	1195207	Oldway Mansion More images
Parish Church of St Luke	Torbay	Church	1863	14 February 1972	SX9130363948; 50°27′55″N 3°31′58″W	1218424	Parish Church of St Luke More images
Parish Church of St Mary	Collaton St Mary	Parish Church	1864-1866	13 March 1951	SX8642760176; 50°25′50″N 3°36′01″W	1207472	Parish Church of St Mary More images
Parish Church of St Mary Magdalene	Torbay	Church	1843-1849	10 January 1975	SX9128964366; 50°28′08″N 3°31′59″W	1219197	Parish Church of St Mary Magdalene More images
Torbay Cinema	Torbay	Cinema	1912	20 February 1991	SX8899860650; 50°26′07″N 3°33′52″W	1208209	Torbay Cinema More images
1–15 Wellswood Park Road	Torbay	Terrace	1853	20 November 1952	SX9295864064; 50°28′00″N 3°30′35″W	1206876	Upload Photo
163 Newton Road	Torquay, Torbay	Atmospheric Railway Engine House	1847-1848	10 January 1975	SX8990166204; 50°29′07″N 3°33′12″W	1217986	163 Newton Road More images
