= Robert Lydston Newcombe =

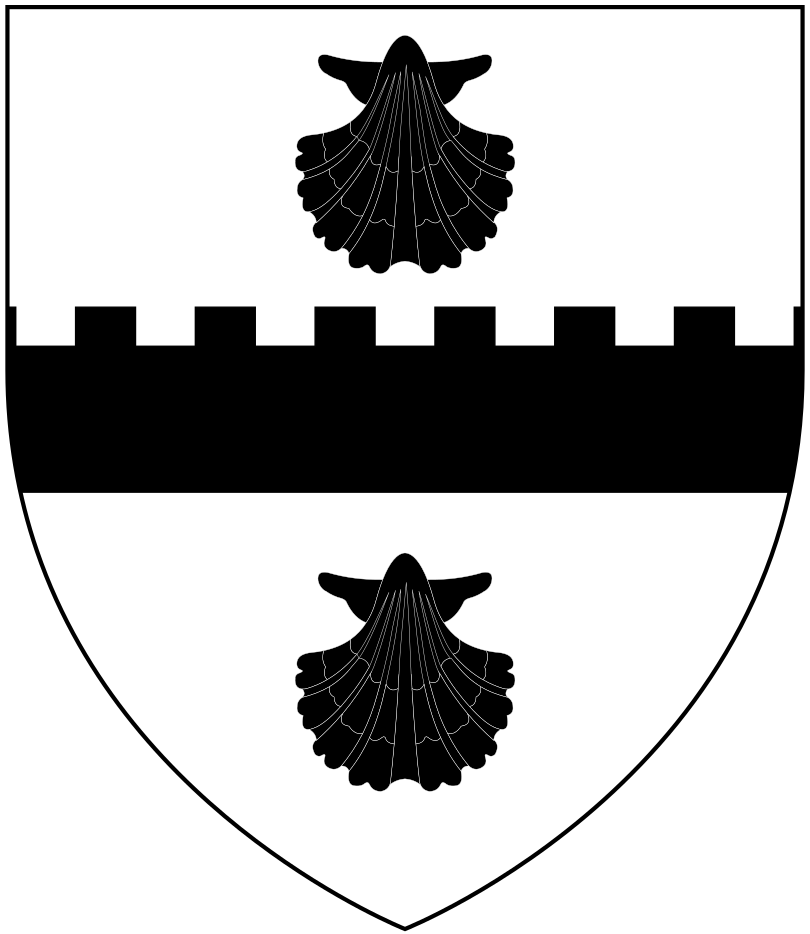
Arms of Newcombe: Argent, a fess embattled between two escallops in pale sable

Robert Lydston Newcombe (1719-1808) of Starcross in the parish of Kenton in Devon, was Sheriff of Devon in 1779.

== Origins ==
He was the son of John Newcombe (1685-1773), an apothecary of St. Kerrian's, Exeter (later residing at Hill's Court in the parish of St. David's, Exeter), by his wife Mary Lydston (1692-1733), a daughter of Robert Lydston, an apothecary of St. Kerrian's, Exeter. John's great-great-grandfather was William Newcombe (d.1614), of All Hallows', Exeter and Mayor of Exeter in 1612, whose unidentified grave is in Exeter Cathedral. The Newcombe family are earliest recorded as residing at Yeo, Chagford in the 14th century where they were involved in the Dartmoor tin industry and later at Drewsteignton, Devon. The arms of Newcombe (Argent, a fess embattled between two escallops in pale sable) are identical to those of Nutcombe of Nutcombe in the parish of Clayhanger, Devon, with altered tinctures.

== Marriage and children ==
He married Hannah Bawden (b.1722, d.1799) on the 9 July 1754 at Littleham, daughter of Humphry Bawden, a mercer in Exeter and his wife Margaret née Newcombe (the paternal aunt of Robert L. Newcombe), by whom they had a son and five daughters, including:

- John Newcombe (1761-1846) of Starcross, Justice of the Peace and High Sheriff for Devon on 4 February 1814, son and heir, who married Harriet Pleydell (1762-1821) of Whatcombe, Long Bredy in Dorset, the daughter of Jonathan Morton Pleydell and his wife Elizabeth née Jackson. Their white marble mural monument and funerary hatchment survive in Kenton Church. He left two daughters and co-heiresses, including:
  - Harriet Newcombe, eldest daughter, who married 27 Feb. 1806 at St. David's, Exeter to Montagu Edmund Parker II (d.1830), son and heir of Montagu Edmund Parker I (1737–1831) of Whiteway House, near Chudleigh and of Blagdon in the parish of Paignton, both in Devon, Sheriff of Devon in 1789. Harriet's eldest son was Montagu Newcombe Parker (1807-1858), of Whiteway, MP for South Devon, who died childless and whose monument is in Exeter Cathedral. Her daughter and eventual sole heiress was Harriet Sophia Parker who married her second cousin Edmund Parker, 2nd Earl of Morley, of Saltram.
  - Eliza(beth) Newcombe, who married 30 Dec. 1809 at St. David's, Exeter to John Stevenson, the son of Robert Stevenson, of Binfield Place, Binfield, Berkshire.

== Death and burial ==
He died on 8 January 1808 and was buried in the south-west corner of the churchyard of St David's Church, Exeter, where survives his large monument topped by obelisks above his grave.
