= Great Parks Reservoir =

Former site of reservoirs and water works

Coordinates: 50.438700°N 3.599621°W

Great Parks Reservoir was a former site of reservoirs and water works situated in the Westerland Stream Valley in Blagdon, Paignton, Devon, United Kingdom. The site is approximately one mile from Paignton town center and is now part of a nature reserve, known as the Westerland Country Park.

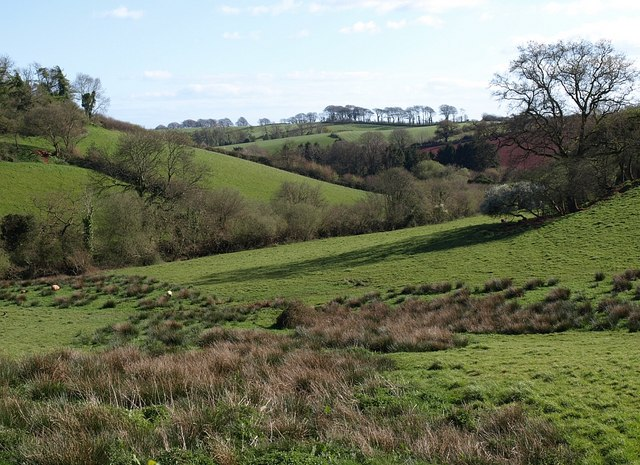
Westerland Valley, looking from Higher Ramshill Lane down the valley as it heads for Great Parks.

== History of the site ==
During the thirteenth century, a watercourse of between two and three miles was constructed by the Bishops of Exeter between the Westerland Valley and the Bishop's Palace in Paignton's old town. Utilising gravitation and travelling both above and under ground, the leat crossed Foxhole Lane, went through the grounds of Primley House, emerging at Winner Street, where it irrigated a vineyard. It then continued to the Palace and nearby mill. This was to be Paignton's only source of fresh water other than local wells and a spring for the next 600 years. It was reported to be still used by households in the Winner Street area for drinking water into the Victorian era.

Paignton Water Act received Royal Assent in 1867. This had been promoted by a private enterprise known as the Paignton Water Company, led by wealthy land developer Mr W. Fletcher. The first reservoir and two sand filter beds were completed in the lower part of the Westerland Valley in the same vicinity as the medieval works - the area known as Great Parks. Its water was first piped into Paignton via a 6inch main in December 1872. This initial reservoir held around 1.5million gallons. Over the next thirty years, various rounds of construction work ultimately saw two large reservoirs established at Great Parks, intended to provide the rapidly developing town of Paignton with fresh water, suitable for drinking. The first reservoir was enlarged to hold 3.25million gallons. A second, lower reservoir at the Great Parks site was completed between 1895 and 1896 and this provided capacity for a further 8million gallons. Two further sand filters and clean water tanks were also installed. A day-long break in service to the town was necessary before these new facilities could become operational.

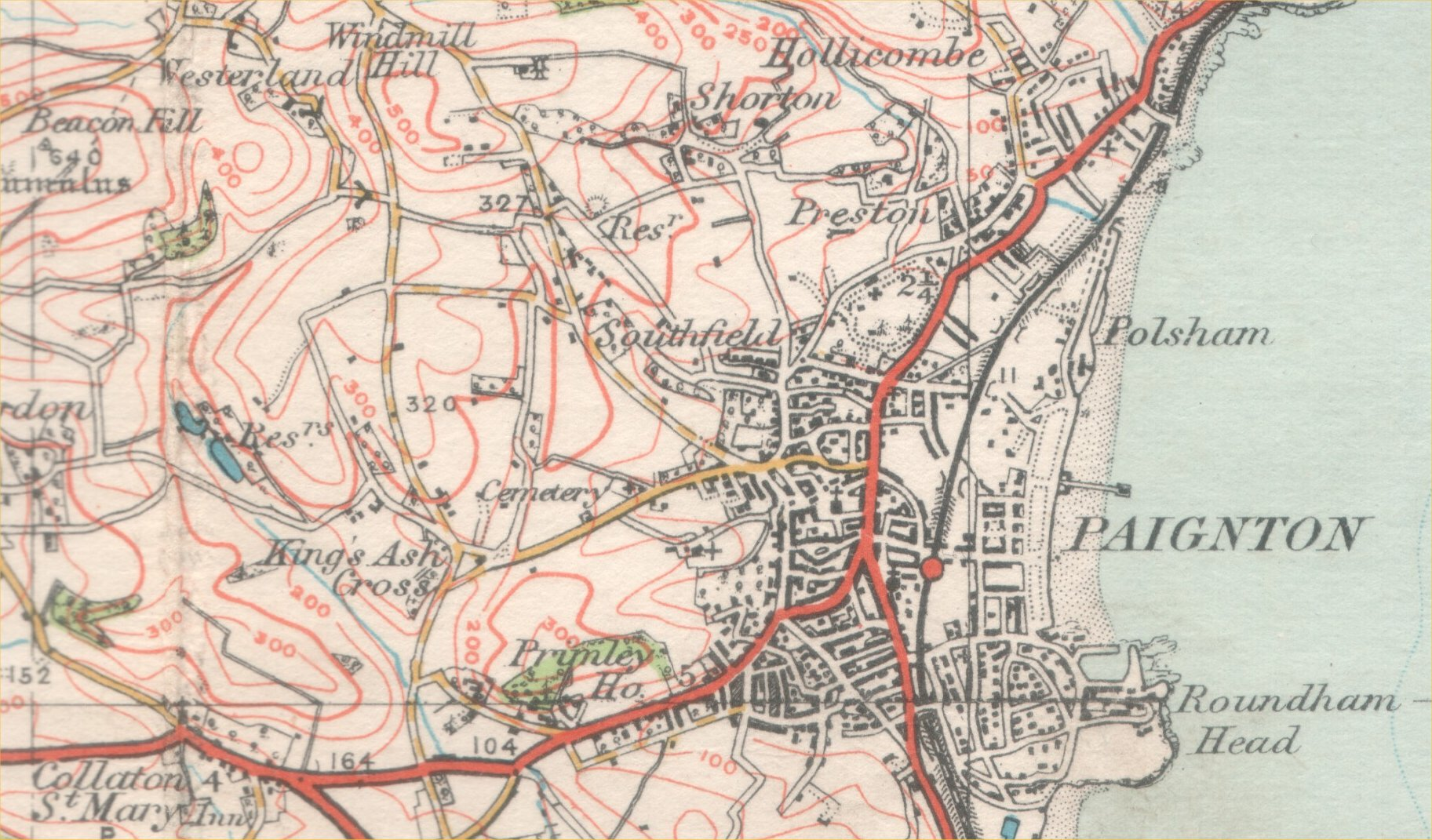
The Great Parks site can be seen on the centre-left of this extract from the Ordnance Survey Popular Edition 1 Inch to 1 mile map (1919).

Despite these developments at Great Parks, complaints of dirty water and supply problems led to Paignton Local Board negotiating to purchase the Water Company in September 1888 for £10,500. (An earlier proposal to purchase the Company in February 1882 had been opposed at a ratepayers' meeting.) The demands of the growing town continued to outstrip supply and a schedule of daily outages in different parts of the town was necessary to balance demand. For a period of around ten years from 1889, the Town Crier would be instructed to warn residents of imminent outages. It also became difficult to ensure water from Great Parks could reach hilly areas then being considered for building development. Even at the 1896 opening ceremony of the expanded facilitates at Great Parks it was admitted that additional growth of the site would soon be needed. In the event, however, a review of its watershed and stream found that developing Great Parks further would not be viable. It was decided in 1889 to instead establish a new reservoir for Paignton at Venford Brook on Holne Moor, Dartmoor

The Great Parks site featured an earthwork embankment, which dammed source water from local springs. As of 1950, the length of the dam at top water level was 355 feet. The catchment area took in some 400 acres, receiving an average rainfall of 39 inches. By this time the reservoirs had a capacity of 11,250,000 gallons, with a water surface area of 4.43 acres and length of 1,085 feet. The reservoirs were a maximum of 12 feet deep. The site produced a daily yield of 300,000 gallons. The total area of the site owned by the local council was 11.3 acres.

By the end of the 1950s, much of Paignton's water was being obtained from Holne and a further reservoir on the River Swincombe on Dartmoor. However, Great Parks was still serving the town during summer months. Great Parks ceased to be used in 1959, with the site transferred back to Paignton Urban District Council from the local Water Board in 1966. With the area intended for use for other purposes, including housing, the reservoirs were drained in the 1970s. Around this time, the area began to be used informally and possibly also in an organised capacity, for off-road motorbiking. Aborted plans to route a ring road through the Westerland Valley were proposed in the 1980s and 1990s but met with opposition by local environmental campaigners.

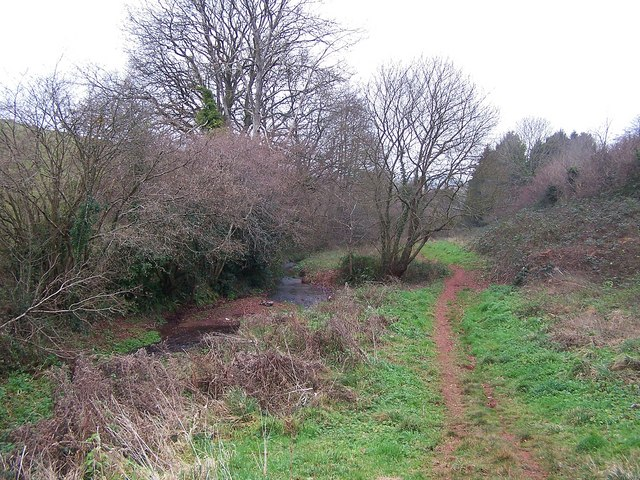
Footpath in Great Parks The small brook is a popular playing place for children in the summer.

== Great Parks Reservoirs today ==
Following drainage, the site was naturalised and has become important for wildlife. The current Westerland Valley Country Park covers a 35-acre site, situated within Paignton's Kings Ash Ward and to the west of Great Parks Chapel. Work to develop the Park continues under the auspices of Groundwork South, as commissioned by Torbay Council. Groundwork are also implementing a flood defence scheme at the site. The Great Parks Community Centre is nearby. As of 2020, Paignton Police were actively warning against the use of the site for off-road motorbiking in order to promote its use as a country park
