= John Kirkham (1472–1529) =

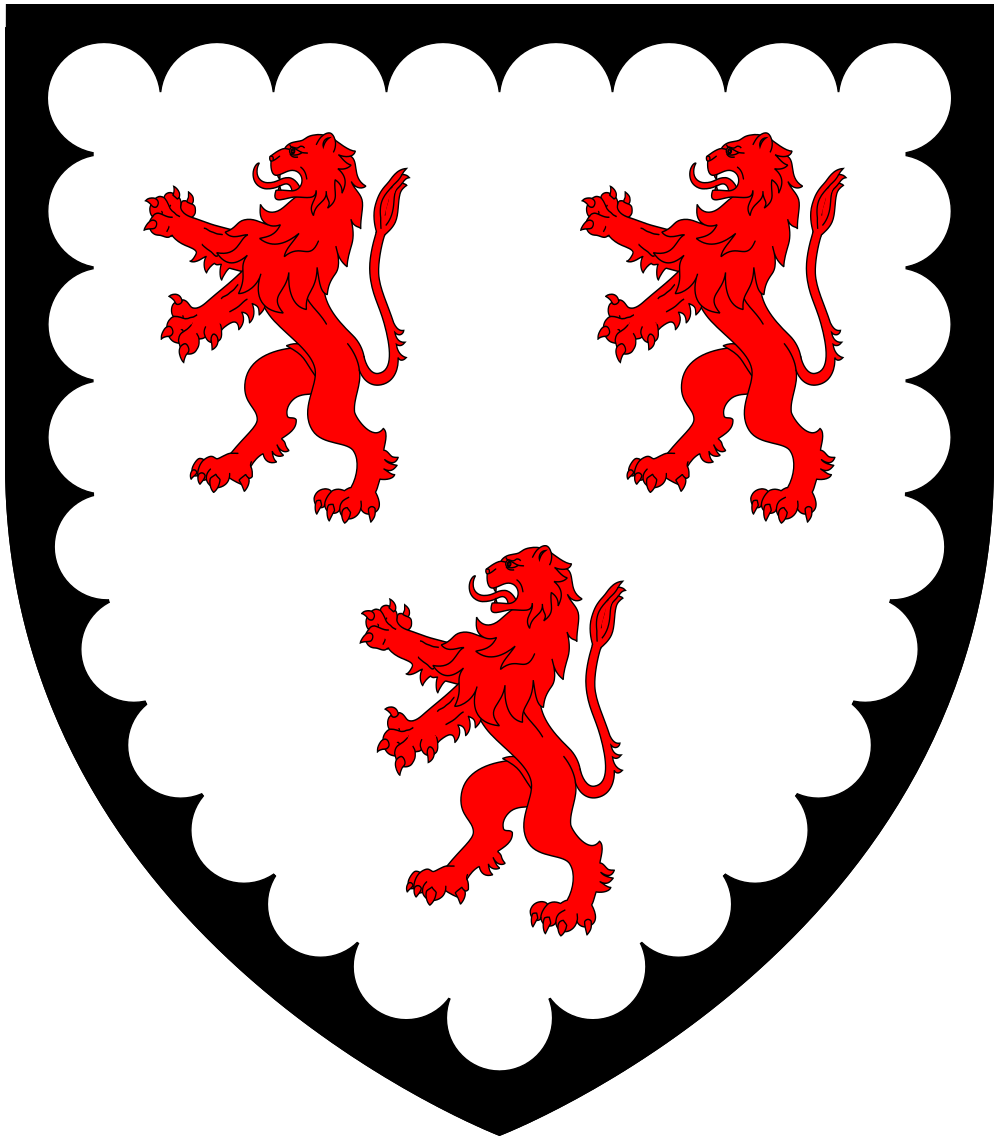
Arms of Kirkham: Argent, three lions rampant gules a bordure engrailed sable

Sir John Kirkham (1472–1529) of Blagdon in the parish of Paignton, Devon, was Sheriff of Devon in 1523/4. He was one of the Worthies of Devon of the Devonshire biographer Prince (d.1723), who called him a "very free and liberal, ... prudent and discreet" benefactor of the town of Honiton in Devon.

== Origins ==
He was the eldest son and heir of Nicholas Kirkham (1433/4-1515/16) of Blagdon, by his wife Joan Waye, daughter and heiress of Robert (or John) Waye of Marsh. The Kirkham family is earliest recorded as seated at Ashcombe in Devon, about 12 miles north of Blagdon. The Kirkham arms survive sculpted on bench-ends in St Nectan's Church, Ashcombe. During the reign of King Edward I (1272–1307) Sir Nicholas Kirkham, Sheriff of Devon in 1308/9, of Ashcombe, married Agatha Dennis, sister and heiress of Sir Robert Dennis (d.pre-1307) of Blagdon, and following the death of Sir Robert Dennis the manor of Blagdon and others including nearby Coleton Clavill (now Collaton St Mary), passed to the Kirkham family, which shortly thereafter moved their seat to Blagdon (but retained ownership of Ashcombe until after the time of Risdon (d.1640)).

== Career ==
Nothing is known about the career of Sir John Kirkham, apart from his benefaction to Honiton (see below) and his service as Sheriff of Devon in 1523/4. The Devonshire biographer Prince (1643–1723) stated: "What other acts of piety or charity he did, or what brave exploits he performed, or exemplary vertues he was eminent for, I no where find; whatever they were, they are all now swallowed up of oblivion".

== Benefaction to Honiton ==
On 20 July 1524, together with Elizaeus Harding, a priest, he made a "large and noble" benefaction to the town of Honiton in Devon, about 34 miles north-east of Blagdon. The benefaction was by way of a trust which he established with at least twenty feoffees, all being "sufficient, honest and discreet" parishioners of Honiton, and endowed with about 19 houses and lands within the parish of Honiton, producing an annual income of £6 10 shillings, to be employed for "good and charitable purposes" within the town and parish of Honiton and also for maintaining the Chapel of All Hallows in Honiton. This Chapel was situated in the middle of the town, and was thus more convenient for the townspeople to use than the parish church, which unusually was situated about one mile outside the town in an isolated location.

== Marriages and progeny ==
He married four times:

- Firstly to a daughter of the Moore family of Moor Hayes in the parish of Cullompton, Devon, without issue. The arms of Kirkham impaling Moore (Ermine, on a chevron azure three cinquefoils or), commemorating this marriage, are included as one of eight heraldic shield of the Moore family in the Moorhayes Chapel of Cullompton Church. (Note : The coat of arms belonging to Chudleigh would look identical, John Chudleigh married Alis (Alice) Moore daughter of Nicholas de la Moor, c. 1436).
- Secondly to a daughter of Sir Thomas Fulford (d.1489) of Great Fulford in the parish of Dunsford, Devon, by his wife Phillipa Courtenay, a daughter of Sir Philip Courtenay (died 1463) of Powderham. Without issue.
- Thirdly to Luce Tremagle, a daughter of Sir Thomas Tremagle, by whom he had progeny 3 sons and 2 daughters:
  - Thomas Kirkham (1504-1551/2), of Blagdon, eldest son and heir, who married twice, firstly to Margaret Ferrers (by whom he had male issue, heirs of Blagdon), daughter and heiress of Richard Ferrers by his wife Jane Malherbe, daughter and heiress of Sir John Malherbe; secondly to Thomasine/Cicely Carew, only daughter and eventual heiress of Sir William Carew of Mohun's Ottery in the parish of Luppit, Devon. His daughter from this marriage, namely Thomasine Kirkham, was the heiress of Mohun's Ottery, and married Thomas Southcott (d.1600) of Bovey Tracey.
  - Richard Kirkham, 2nd son;
  - John Kirkham, 3rd son;
  - Joane/Johanna Kirkham, wife of John Hillersdon (1501-1568/9) of Membland in the parish of Holbeton, Devon.
  - Elizabeth Kirkham.
- Fourthly to Jane Mathew, daughter and heiress of William Mathew of Milton, without issue.

== Death and burial ==
He died on 11 July 1529, and was buried within the Kirkham Chapel, occupying the south transept of St John's Church, Paignton, in which his father had built the magnificent Kirkham Chantry Chapel, consisting of a broad stone screen profusely decorated with biblical scenes and containing the chest tombs of himself and his wife and of his parents, Robert Kirkham (d.1443) and Elizabeth Scobhill.

== Sources ==
- Prince, John, (1643–1723) The Worthies of Devon, 1810 edition, London, p. 555, biography of Kirkham, Sir John, Kt
- Vivian, Lt.Col. J.L., (Ed.) The Visitations of the County of Devon: Comprising the Heralds' Visitations of 1531, 1564 & 1620, Exeter, 1895, pp. 516–17, pedigree of Kirkham of Blagdon
