= Chelston, Torquay =

Area of Torquay, Devon, England

Coordinates: 50.463°N 03.55°W

Chelston
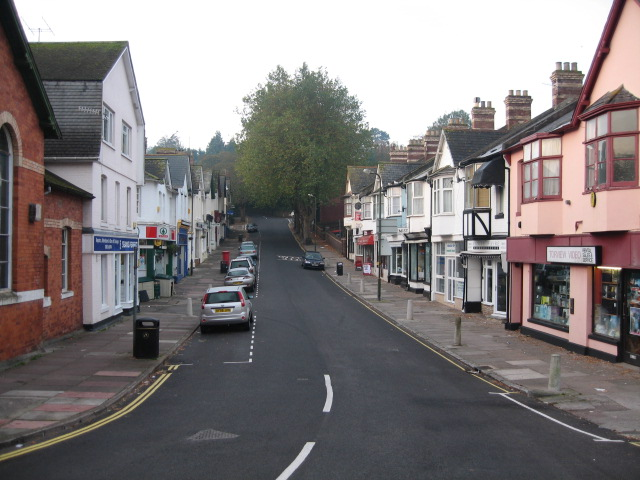
- Shops in Chelston Old Mill Road in 2006

- Location within Devon
- Population: 7,951
- Unitary authority: Torbay
- Ceremonial county: Devon
- Region: South West
- Country: England
- Sovereign state: United Kingdom
- Post town: Torquay
- Postcode district: TQ2
- Police: Devon and Cornwall
- Fire: Devon and Somerset
- Ambulance: South Western
- UK Parliament: Torbay

Chelston is an area of Torquay, Devon, England, and one of the town's most historic and best preserved Victorian suburbs, with many of the area's typical red sandstone buildings designated within the Chelston Conservation Area. Its statistical area is part of the Cockington with Chelston ward, which includes the neighbouring areas of Cockington and Livermead. The population of the entire ward is 7,951 as of 2018.

The modern day area of Chelston is located almost entirely west of the Riviera Line railway tracks, with its northern boundaries taking in the lower half of Queensway and Sherwell Valley, bordered to the west with Cockington Village, and to the south by Corbyn Head and the sea.

== History ==
Three neolithic stone axes were found near Chelston Tower in the 1890s and flint scrapers south of Nut Bush Lane. Chilestone was first mentioned about 1238, but was part of Cockington, until sold by the Mallocks in 1932. In 1449 it was referred to as Chilston. In 1659 there were 23 cottages in Chilston. Parts of Chelston Manor date from about 1600. It was the Dower House of Cockington Court. By 1861 there was a small village around Old Mill Road and Seaway Lane, which grew around 1867 and again after 1882.

From 15 to 17 May 1882, the Devon County Agricultural Association Show was held on the grounds of Chelston Manor, around present day Walnut Road.

By 1891 the population was 1,717 in detached and semi-detached villas, plus a few terraces near Torquay railway station. Seaway Lane still retains the typical Devon earth banks and hedgerow trees. In 1895 St Matthew's Church was begun and the area nearby largely built up by 1904.

A tornado struck the area on the morning of 17 October 1898, causing varying degrees of damage to houses in Sherwell Valley and minor injuries to residents.

Buses have served the suburb since 1903 and were extended in the 1950s, as the council housing development spread. The Church of the Holy Angels was built in 1938 to serve a new council housing estate. Only 32 houses remain in social ownership, most having been sold since the Housing Act 1980.

== Notable buildings and places ==
- Chelston Cross - built in 1867 as the home of William Froude the building was later known as Manor House Hotel before being converted into multiple residences in 2004.
- Chelston Manor - a 17th-century manor house and reputed to be one of the oldest buildings in Torquay. For centuries the building was used to perform the duties of a dower house to Cockington Court and today the building is a hotel and public house.
- Corbyn Beach and Corbyn Head
- Grand Hotel
- Sherwell Park - originally operated by Devon Rosery & Fruit Farm Ltd for growing rose bushes for export to South Africa, the land was acquired by Torbay Borough Council in 1928 and opened as a public park in 1930. The Sherwell Water stream, which springs at Sherwell Valley Primary School, runs through the park after it was rerouted from its former parallel course under the present-day Mallock Road/Innerbrook Road.
- Torquay railway station

== Churches ==
- Chelston Methodist Church, opened in 1908
- Church of the Holy Angels, opened in 1938
- St Matthew's Church, built in 1885
- St Peter's Church Centre, built in 1962

== Transport ==
Torquay railway station, located in the south-eastern corner of Chelston, is the principal railway station for the town of Torquay with regional connections on the Riviera Line and national trains via the Great Western Railway network. The local bus service, Stagecoach Devon, operates circular route number 35 connecting the area with downtown Torquay and other suburbs.

== Sport ==
Chelston Football Club, formed in the 1920s, competed in the Devon and Exeter Football League from 1951 to 2004 but, due to poor finances, the club merged with Kingskerswell FC in 2006. Competing under the new name of Kingskerswell & Chelston FC in the South Devon Football League, they eventually moved away from their home at Armada Park to play in Kingskerswell.

== Gallery ==
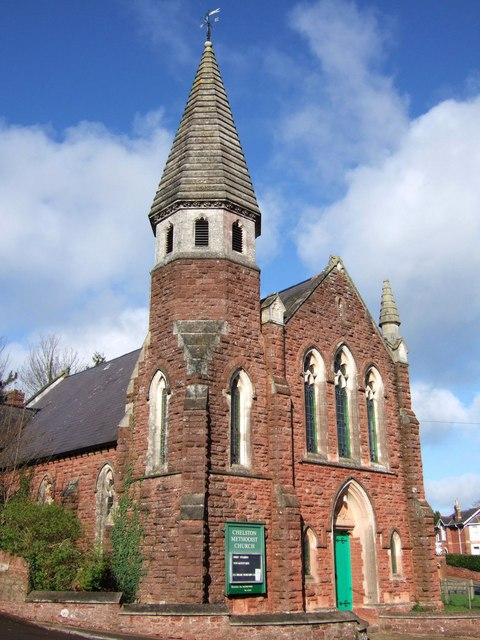
Methodist church built of local red sandstone in 1908

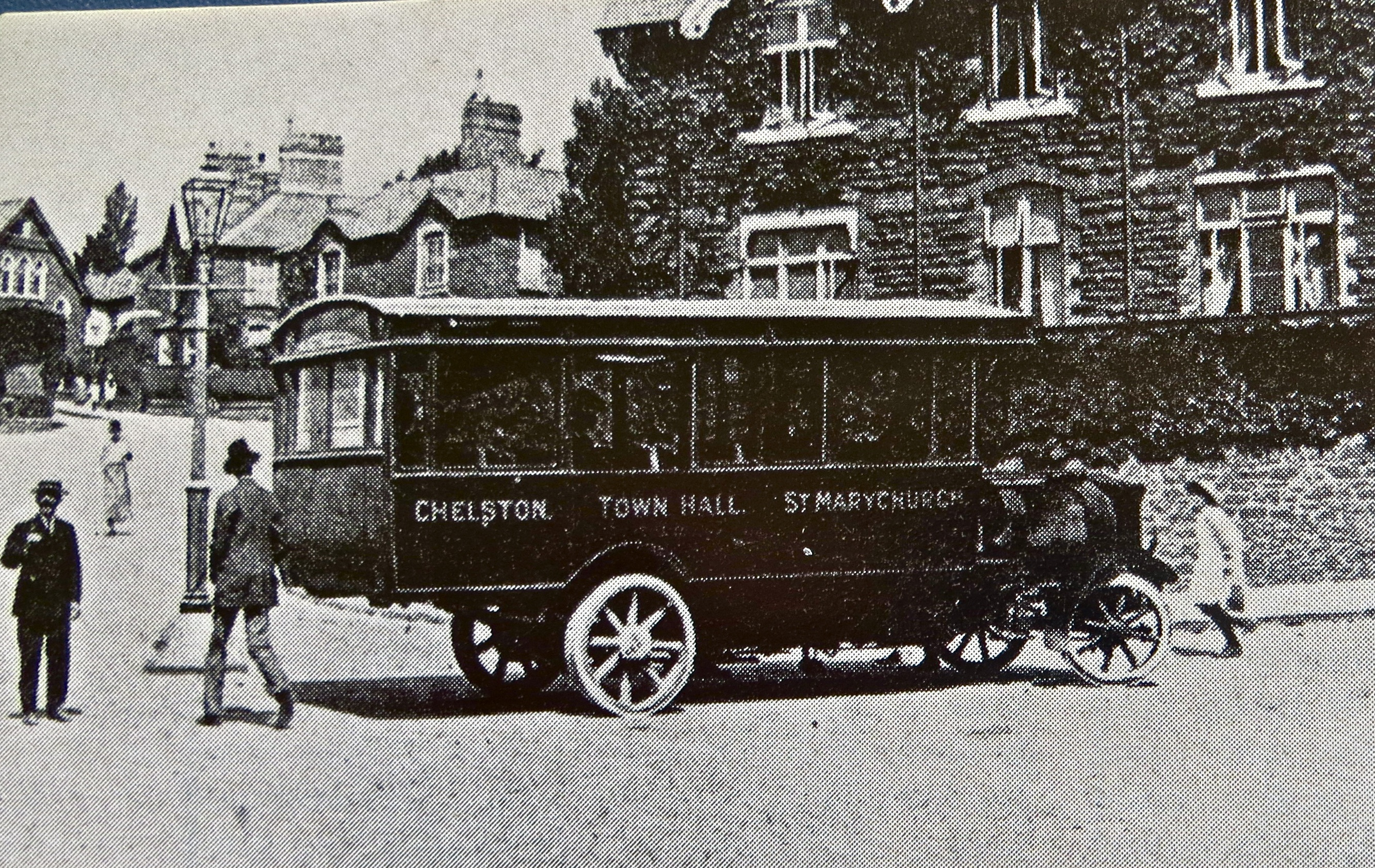
Clarkson steam bus operated by Torquay-Chelston Steam Car Company at Sharon House in 1913

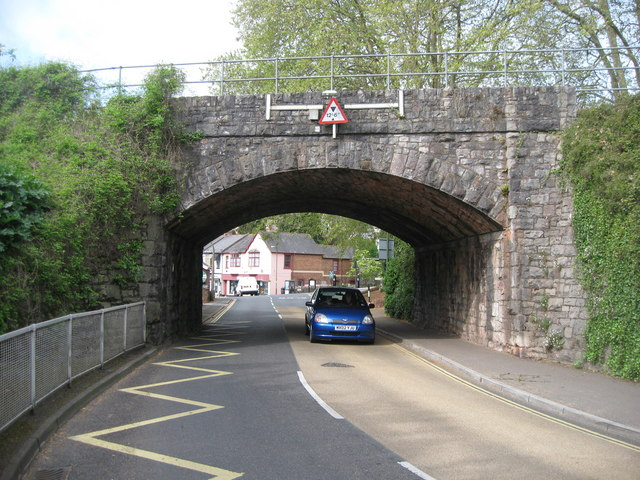
The low bridge limits double deck bus access to Chelston

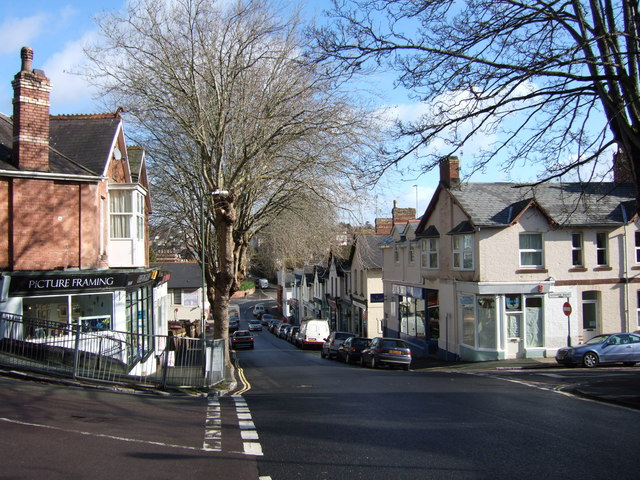
Old Mill Road

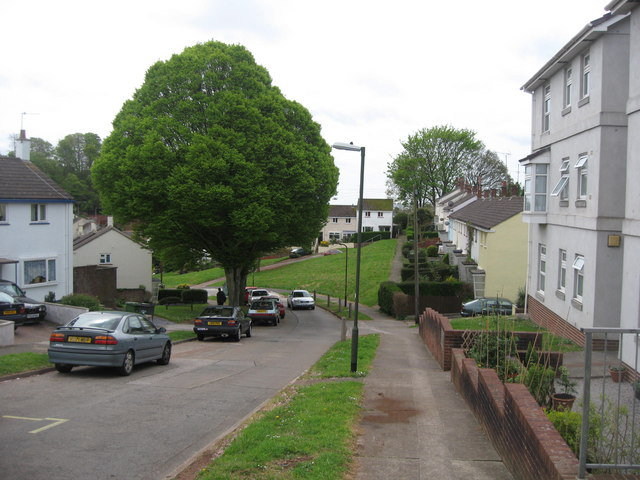
Raleigh Avenue showing post war developments.
