= Whiteway House =

Country house in Devon, England

Coordinates: 50.6353°N 3.5897°W

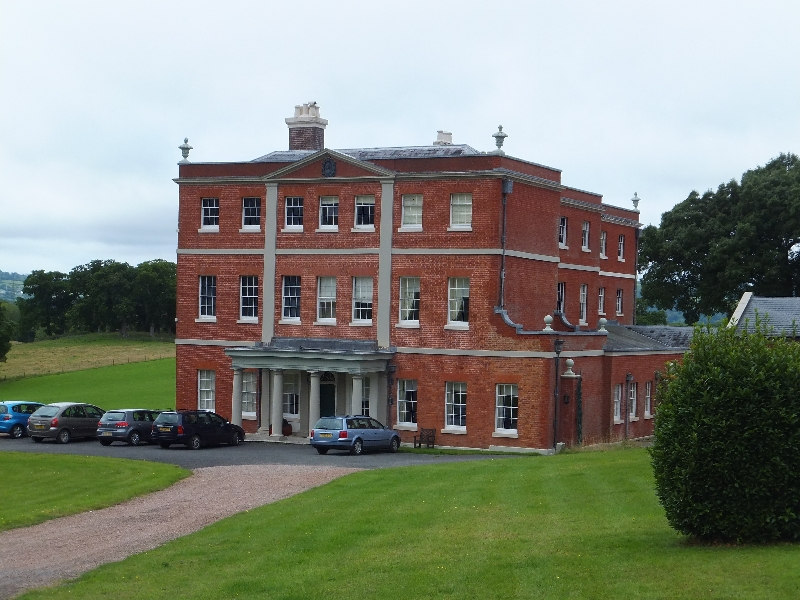
Whiteway House, Chudleigh, in 2011

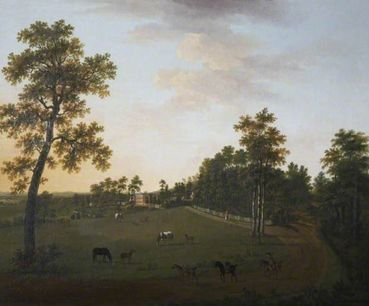
Whiteway House, Chudleigh, Devon. Painted by William Tomkins, 1771. National Trust, Saltram House, Devon, Collection

Whiteway House in the parish of Chudleigh in Devon is a Grade II* listed Georgian house set in parkland. It was built in the 1770s by John Parker, 1st Baron Boringdon (1735–1788) of Saltram House, Plympton, and has early 19th-century alterations. It is situated 2 1/2 miles (4 km) north of Chudleigh, at the foot of the Haldon Hills. The house had formerly a 5-bay north-east wing, a service range and a separate 19th-century service block to the rear, all demolished since 1962.

It should be distinguished from Whiteway in the parish of Kingsteignton, Devon, 4 3/4 miles (7.6 km) to the south, a manor listed in the Domesday Book as the 157th Devonshire possession of Baldwin de Moels (died 1090), Sheriff of Devon, feudal baron of Okehampton, and in 1795 a grand mansion illustrated by Swete, formerly a seat of the Yard family of Bradley, Kingsteignton, and today a farmhouse known as Whiteway Barton.

== Descent of the estate ==
=== Bennett ===
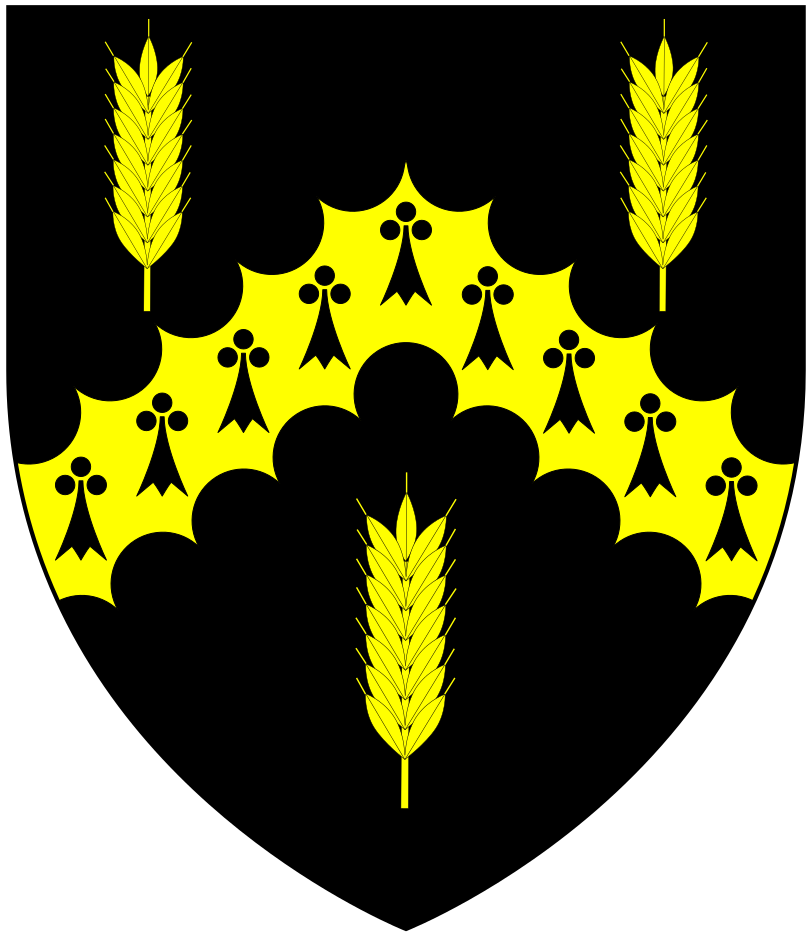
Arms of Bennett: Sable, a chevron engrailed erminois between three ears of wheat or

The Devon historian Thomas Westcote (d.1637) gives the pedigree of the family of Bennett as follows: " Richard Bennet married Julian, daughter of William Whiteway of Chudleigh parish, and had issue Nicholas, William, and John. Nicholas married Elizabeth, daughter of Thomas Pomeroy, of Brindley in the parish of Harberton, knight, and had issue John, William sine prole, English, (married to Thomas Thorn of Mamhead;) Julian, (to Roger Harewell of Kingsteignton;) Joan, (to Peter Bear of the same;) Sabine. (to Humphrey Ball of Chudleigh.) John married a daughter of John Trosse, of Exeter". A ledger stone survives in the north aisle of Chudleigh Church inscribed as follows:

"Here lyeth ye body of John Bennett, Gentleman, late of Whitewaye, who was borne ye 7th of October, Ano 1573, and was buried ye 29th of November, An(n)o 1629"

The last mention of the name in the Parish Register is in 1634. The arms of Bennett of Whiteway, Chudleigh, were: Sable, a chevron engrailed erminois between three ears of wheat or

=== Parker ===
Arms of Parker, Barons Boringdon and Earls of Morley: Sable, a stag's head cabossed between two flaunches argent; Crest: A cubit arm couped below the elbow the sleeve azure cuffed and slashed argent the hand grasping a stag's attires (i.e. antlers) gules

The present house was built in the 1770s by John Parker, 1st Baron Boringdon (1735–1788) of Saltram House, Plympton. The estate had been purchased in 1722 by his grandfather George Parker (d.1743) of Boringdon and North Molton, both in Devon, as the following summary of a deed dated 14 March 1722 relates:

"Agreement 1) George Bennett and Henry Bennett, his son and heir apparent, both of Whiteway 2) George Parker of Boringdon, esquire. Conveyance of the estate of inheritance in fee simple of the tenements called Whiteway, Wolcombe and Oxencombe"

He had also purchased Saltram before in 1712 and at another time Polsloe Priory. Whiteway became the residence of Lord Boringdon's younger brother Montagu Edmund Parker (1737–1831), of Blagdon in the parish of Paignton, who was Sheriff of Devon in 1789 and whose two portraits by Sir Joshua Reynolds and John Downman survive at Saltram House. It became the residence of his grandson Montagu Edmund Newcombe Parker (1807–1858), Conservative MP for South Devon (1835–41) and Sheriff of Devon in 1849, whose tomb can be seen in Chudleigh churchyard. Lord Boringdon's grandson Edmund Parker, 2nd Earl of Morley (1810–1864) married in 1842 Harriet Parker (1809–1897), his second cousin and sister and heiress of Montagu E.N. Parker, and Whiteway thus returned into the possession of the senior line of the family when it became in 1897 the inheritance of Hariett's son Albert Edmund Parker, 3rd Earl of Morley (1843–1905). The 3rd Earl had inherited debts of £200,000 from his father who had been forced by his poor financial situation to let Saltram to tenants from 1861, three years before his death, which tenancies continued for 23 years until 1884. During this exile from Saltram the Earls lived partly abroad, in rented London houses and at Whiteway with the Dowager Countess Hariett. The 2nd Earl died at Whiteway on 23 August 1864. The 3rd Earl married well to a wealthy heiress, Margaret Holford, daughter and eventual heiress of the very wealthy Robert Stayner Holford of Westonbirt House in Gloucestershire, and finances recovered temporarily until the agricultural slump of the start of the 20th century forced the 4th Earl to let Whiteway in 1911, the proceeds from which he used to make improvements at Saltram. However the family's finances did not recover and he sold Whiteway in 1923. The Parker family of Whiteway acquired the manor of Collaton St Mary, near Paignton, the public house of which is still called (in 2012) the "Parker Arms".

=== Farquhar ===
Due to straightened financial circumstances, it appears that the house had been let to Ernest Farquhar (1853–1930), grandson of Sir Thomas Harvie Farquhar, 2nd Baronet of Cadogan House. He married Maria Theresa Lister, daughter of Sir Thomas Villiers Lister, and a relative through Fanny Coryton, (Pentille Castle) of the Parker family. Many Parker family albums, objets trouves and memorabilia were passed down through the generations. Ernest and Maria-Theresa Farquhar purchased the property in 1923. They had two sons, the younger of whom was Lt. Rupert Farquhar MC of the 4th Battalion Grenadier Guards, killed in action on 17 September 1917 in Belgium aged 20. His tombstone in the Canada Farm Cemetery in Belgium records his parents as of Whiteway in Chudleigh as does his entry on the Chudleigh War Memorial. The eldest son was Sir Harold Lister Farquhar (1894–1953), MC, CMG, Consul General in Barcelona Spain, & Naples, Italy and Ambassador to Sweden. After WWI Harold married Constance Audrey Capell, and they had two sons, Ian and Adrian. The occupant in the 1960s was the younger son, Adrian Farquhar and his wife and daughter. It was sold in 1967, and bought by three consecutive owners. The Knapp family, O'Shea family, and Gerald Johnson.

=== Legge ===
Whiteway was offered for sale in 1973. In 2000 Whiteway was purchased with 281 acres by Raine Spencer, Countess Spencer (1929-2016), who had married as her first husband Gerald Legge, 9th Earl of Dartmouth (d. 1997), from whom she was divorced in 1976. The estate was being operated in 2002 by her son William Legge, 10th Earl of Dartmouth (born 1949) for commercial deer-stalking.

== Sources ==
- Johnson, Ceri. National Trust guidebook "Saltram, Devon", 2005
- British Listed Buildings text, Whiteway House, Chudleigh
- Jones, Mary. The history of Chudleigh, in the County of Devon, and the Surrounding Scenery, Seats, Families, etc. History of Chudleigh, c. 1870, Chapter 8
