= Church of St Mary, Collaton St Mary =

Coordinates: 50.433347°N 3.59947°W

Church of St Mary
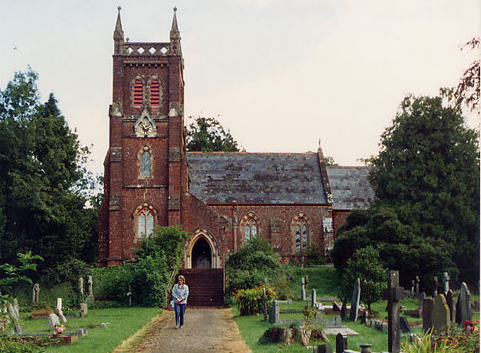

- Location in Devon
- OS grid reference: SX 86427 60176
- Location: Blagdon Road, Collaton St Mary, Devon
- Country: England
- Denomination: Church of England

History
- Status: Parish church
- Founded: 21 September 1864
- Dedication: St Mary

Architecture
- Functional status: Active
- Heritage designation: Grade II*
- Designated: 13 March 1951
- Architect: J.W. Rowell
- Architectural type: Church
- Style: Decorated Gothic Revival
- Groundbreaking: 1864
- Completed: 1866

The Church of St Mary, in the village of Collaton St Mary in Devon, was built between 1864 and 1866 in memory of Mary Maxwell Hogg, teenaged daughter of the Rev John Roughton Hogg, owner of the nearby Blagdon Barton estate, and granddaughter of hymnwriter and vicar Henry Francis Lyte. It is a Grade II* listed building.
