= Grand Hotel (Torquay) =

Hotel in Devon, England

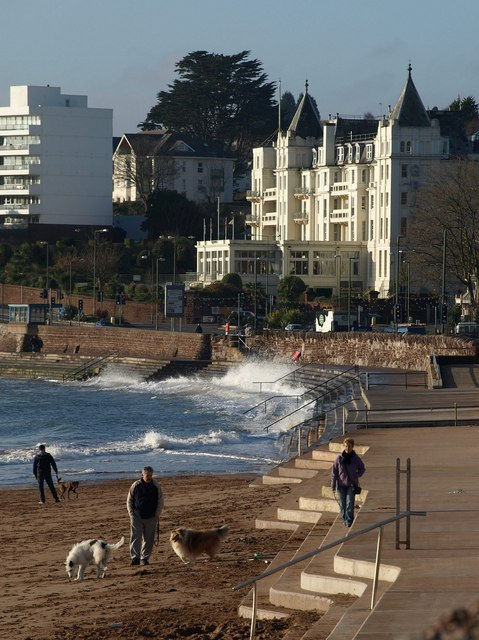

- Location within Devon

General information
- Location: Torquay, Devon, England
- Coordinates: 50°27′36″N 3°32′30″W

Technical details
- Floor count: 4 and lower ground

Website
- Official site

The Grand Hotel is a hotel in Torquay, Devon. The Restaurant 1881 holds an AA Rosette for fine dining. The hotel has 132 bedrooms and 4 floors.

The Grand Hotel first opened in Torquay in 1881, in response to the Great Western Railway’s expansion into the South West.

In 1926, it was one of the first hotels in the UK to install central heating.

During World War II, the hotel was requisitioned by the Royal Air Force, reopening as a hotel in 1946.

Originally built with just 12 bedrooms, The Grand has been expanded several times to reach its present size of 132 en-suite bedrooms. Since 2001 it has been part of the Richardson Hotels group.

On 11 February 2022, the hotel suffered a fire. Two people were treated for smoke inhalation.
