= Cockington Court =

Historic house in Devon, England

Coordinates: 50°27′50″N 3°33′51″W

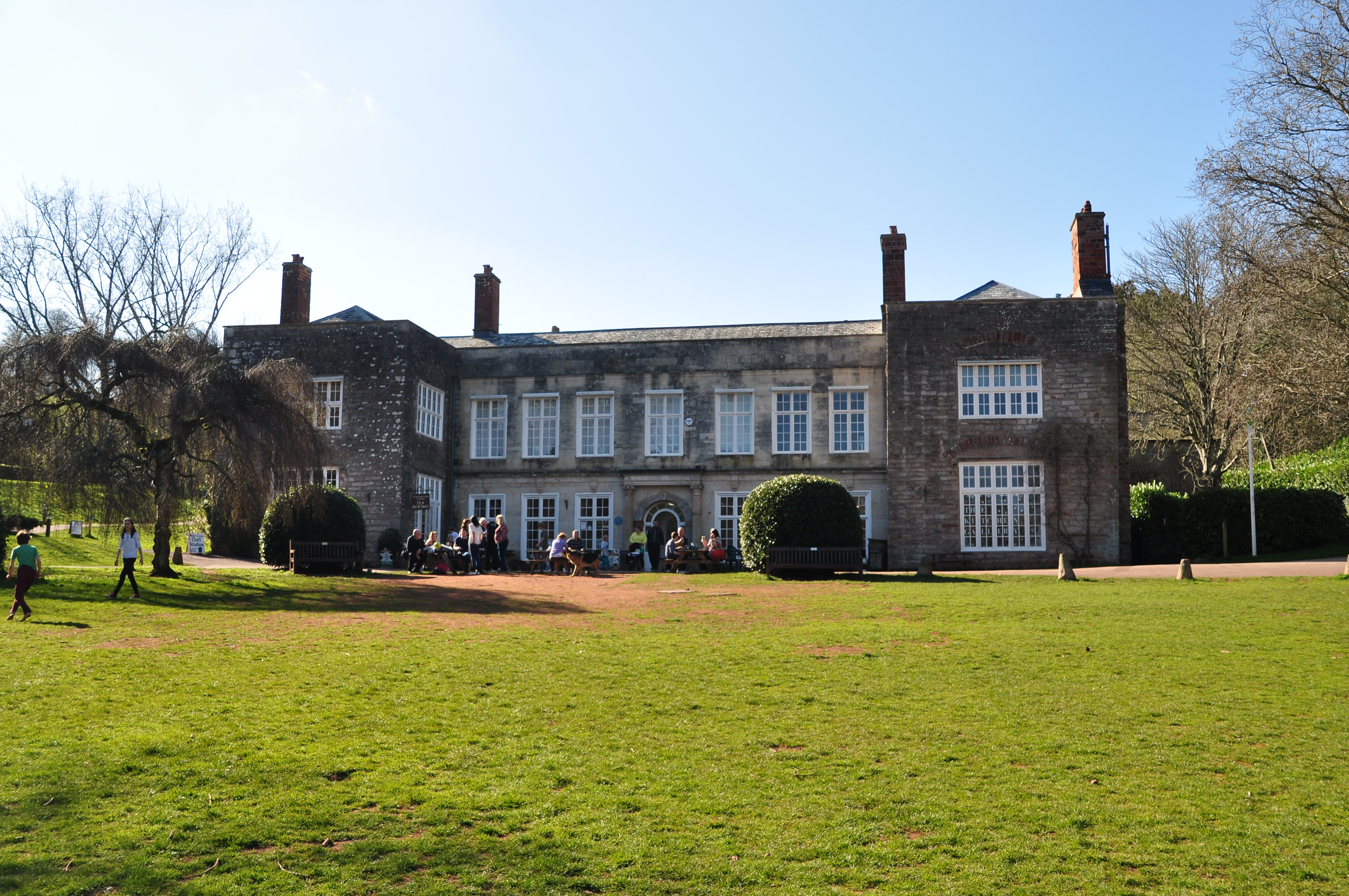
Cockington Court

Cockington Court, near Torquay in Devon, England, is Grade II* listed on the English Heritage Register. The manor dates back to Saxon times, and is mentioned in Domesday Book. The current house was built in the 16th century, when it was owned by the Cary family. Today it is a craft centre and a venue for special events.

== Residents ==
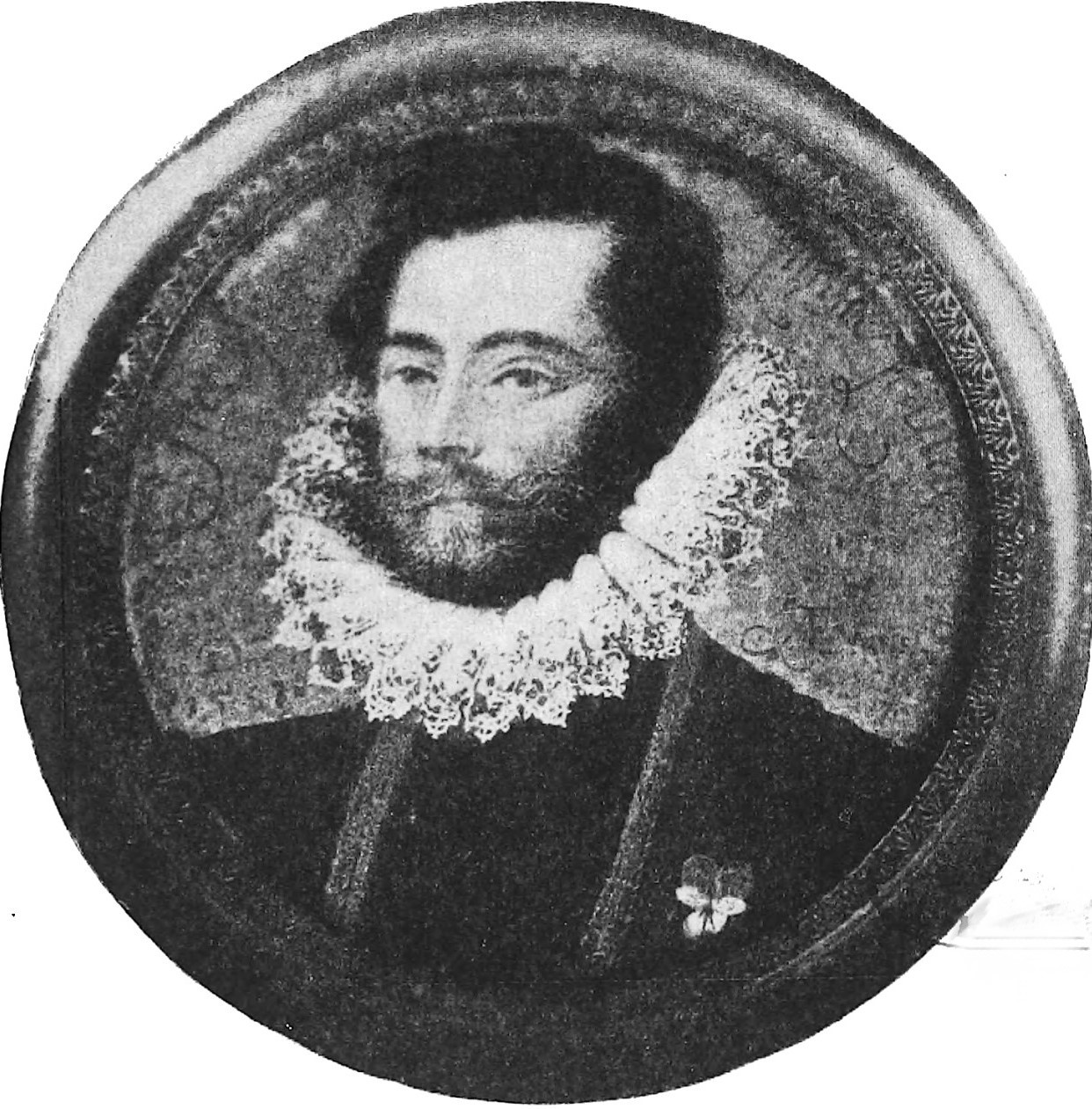
Sir George Cary (died 1617)

The Cary family built the house in the 16th century, one of its prominent members being Sir George Cary. The house was inherited by two of his younger brothers, before his nephew, George, succeeded to ownership. On his death in 1643 the estate went to Sir Henry Cary, the last of the family to own it. A Major in the Royalist Army, the Civil War forced him to sell much of his property including Cockington Court, the new owner being Roger Mallock. His son, politician Rawlin Mallock, made extensive alterations in 1673.

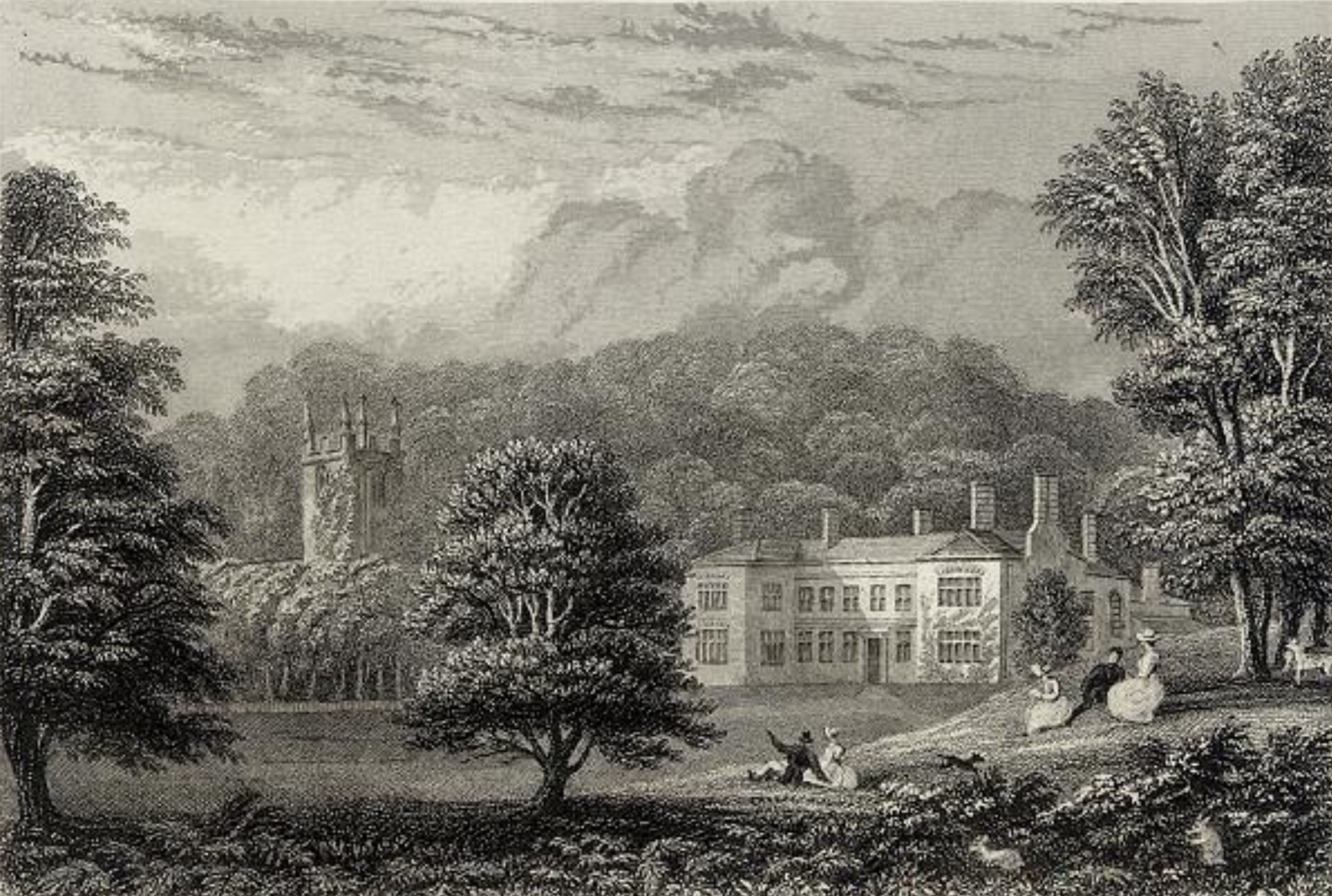
Engraving of Cockington Court 1830

A later owner, Charles Herbert Mallock, was with his wife a personal friend of Agatha Christie, who came frequently to Cockington Court for social and theatrical events. In 1932 it was announced that the Cockington Estate was for sale; it was later bought by the Torbay Council.

== Agatha Christie at Cockington Court ==
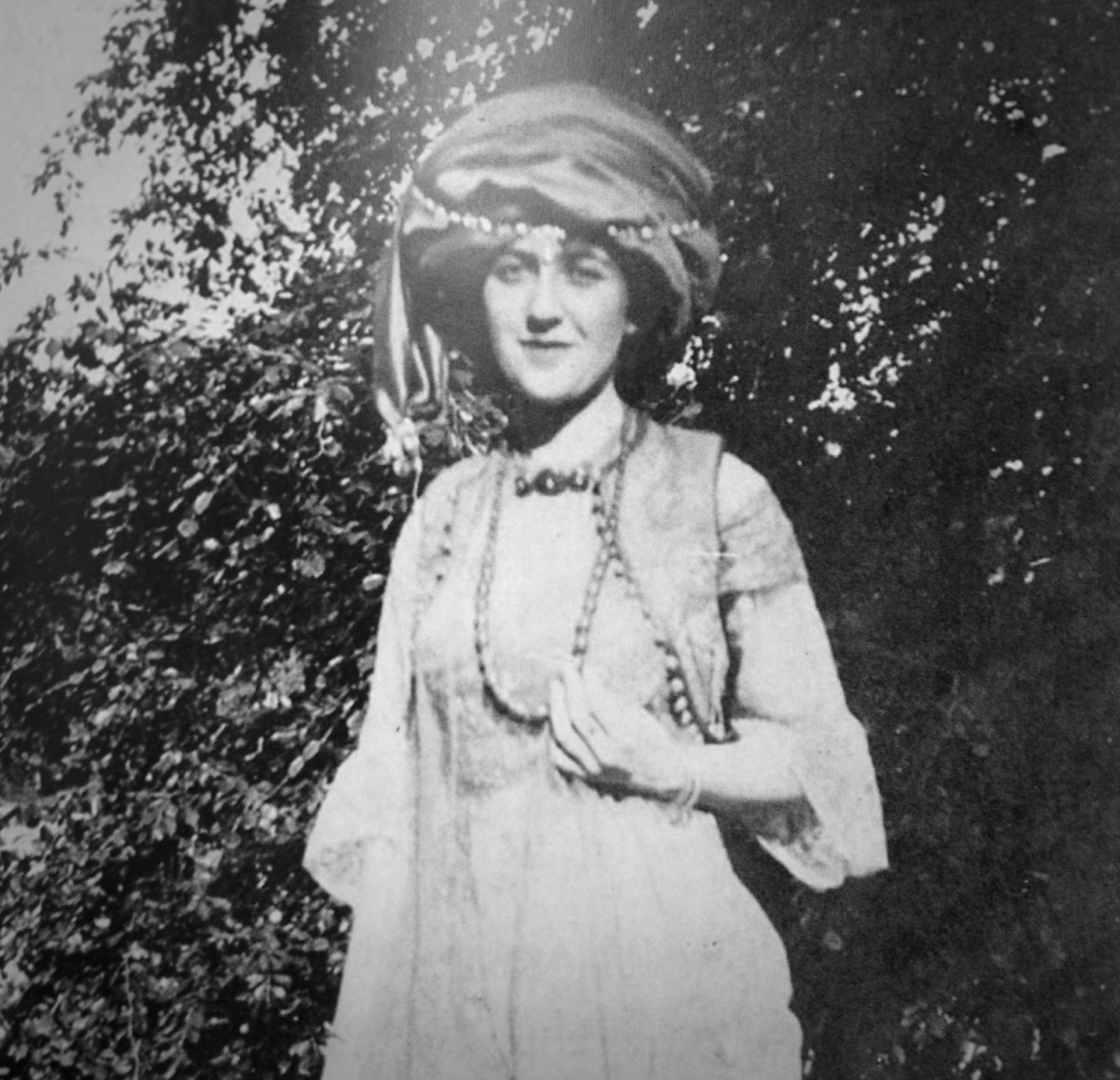
Agatha Christie at Cockington Court in 1912. She was dressed as Sister Anne in the play "Blue Beard of Unhappiness"

Agatha Christie was a friend of the Mallock family and came on numerous occasions to Cockington Court.

Joan Millyard was the sister of Margaret Mallock, the wife of the owner Charles Mallock, and recalled the time that Agatha visited the house. She said.

"She used to come over to Cockington Court to take part in the amateur theatricals my sister organised. I remember the time she played in a burlesque about Bluebeard and they had a photograph taken on the lawn. Oh they had a lot of fun dressing up and it was all good, clean and wholesome."

In her autobiography Agatha recalled the play about Bluebeard that was held at Cockington Court. She said:

"Then, a year or so later, I lost my heart again, when acting in a musical play got up by friends in Torquay – a version of Bluebeard, with topical words, written by themselves. I was Sister Anne, and the object of my affections later became an Air Vice-Marshal. He was young then–at the beginning of his career."

Biographers of Agatha Christie also recall this event. Janet Morgan said.

"As Agatha grew into her twenties, the amateur theatricals became grander, with a bigger cast: one set of photographs, taken in 1912 or so, shows her larking about with a dozen friends, the women in beads and veils and the men in baggy trousers, turbans and magnificent whiskers, for a performance of “The Blue Beard of Unhappiness”, an original work in part derived from A Thousand and One Nights, Blue Beard and light musical comedy. (Its nature is indicated by the title of Act 1: Why Did They Bag-Dad?) It was put on at Cockington Court, where Agatha’s friends the Mallocks lived; Mrs Mallock played Scheherazade, and Agatha, in voluminous harem trousers, Sister Anne."

Julius Green described the play in the following terms.

"As a young woman, Agatha continued her own forays onto the stage. Photographs show her and her friends gloriously costumed for “The Blue Beard of Unhappiness”, which the programme (printed on blue paper of course) reveals to be ‘A drama of Eastern domestic life in two acts’.9 An open air production with a dozen in the cast, it is, we are told, set on a part of the terrace in Blue Beard’s castle in ‘Bagdad".

Joan Millyard also recalled when Charles Mallock was killed in the war in 1917. She said.

"She became a great friend of my sister who had married a Mallock and later when my sister's husband was killed in the wars Agatha used to go over regularly to see her and her one surviving twin. My sister was expecting her twins when she was out on the road and was handed a telegram that her husband Charlie Mallock had been killed. The shock was so great to her that while the baby girl lived the boy died. Agatha was very understanding and kind to her in that period."

Agatha dedicated two of her books to Margaret's older sons Richard and Christopher who are mentioned above. In 1934 Why Didn't They Ask Evans? was dedicated to Christopher and in 1938 Appointment with Death was dedicated to Richard and his wife Myra whose photo is shown. The title page says “To Richard and Myra Mallock to remind them of their journey to Petra.
