= Montagu Edmund Parker =

English official

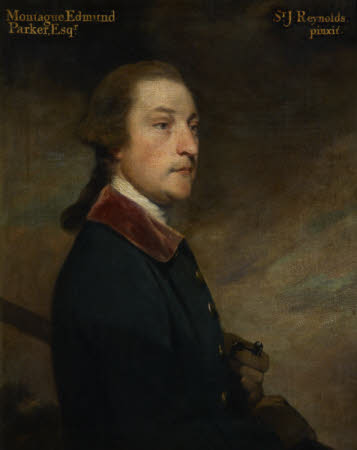
- Montagu Edmund Parker (1737-1813), portrait dated 1768 by Sir Joshua Reynolds (1723-1792), who was born in Plympton and painted many pictures for his friends the Parker family of Saltram. Collection of National Trust, Saltram House, ref:NT 872086
- Born: Montagu Edmund Parker c. 1737
- Died: c. 1813
- Spouse: Charity Ourry
- Parents: John Parker and Catherine Poulett

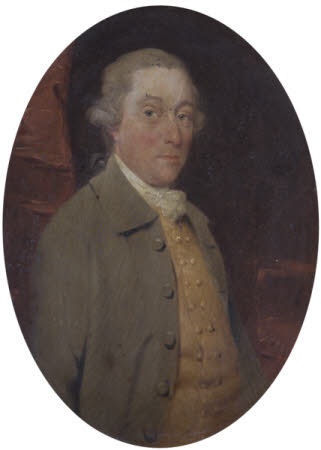
Montagu Edmund Parker (1737-1813), miniature portrait 1780, by John Downman (1750-1824). Collection of National Trust, Saltram House, ref: NT 872210

Arms of Parker: Sable, a stag's head cabossed between two flaunches argent

Montagu Edmund Parker (1737–1813) of Whiteway House, near Chudleigh and of Blagdon in the parish of Paignton, both in Devon, was Sheriff of Devon in 1789. Portraits of him by Sir Joshua Reynolds (educated at Plympton Grammar School and a friend of the Parker family) and John Downman survive at Saltram House.

== Origins ==
He was born in 1737, the 3rd son of John Parker (1703–1768) of Boringdon Hall, Plympton, of Saltram House, Plympton and of Court House North Molton, all in Devon, by his wife Catherine Poulett (1706-1758), whom he married in 1725, a daughter of John Poulett, 1st Earl Poulett by his wife Bridget Bertie, a granddaughter of Montagu Bertie, 2nd Earl of Lindsey. His elder brother was John Parker, 1st Baron Boringdon (1735-1788) of Saltram, whose son was John Parker, 1st Earl of Morley (1772-1840). The Parker family had risen to prominence in the mid-16th century as the bailiff of the manor of North Molton, Devon, under Baron Zouche of Haryngworth.

== Career ==
He served as Sheriff of Devon in 1789. He inherited various of his father's secondary estates including Blagdon, Paignton and adjoining Collaton Kirkham (now Collaton St Mary), which his father had inherited from his younger brother Francis Parker of Blagdon. The public house in Collaton St Mary is called the "Parkers Arms" (sic) after his tenure.

== Marriage and progeny ==
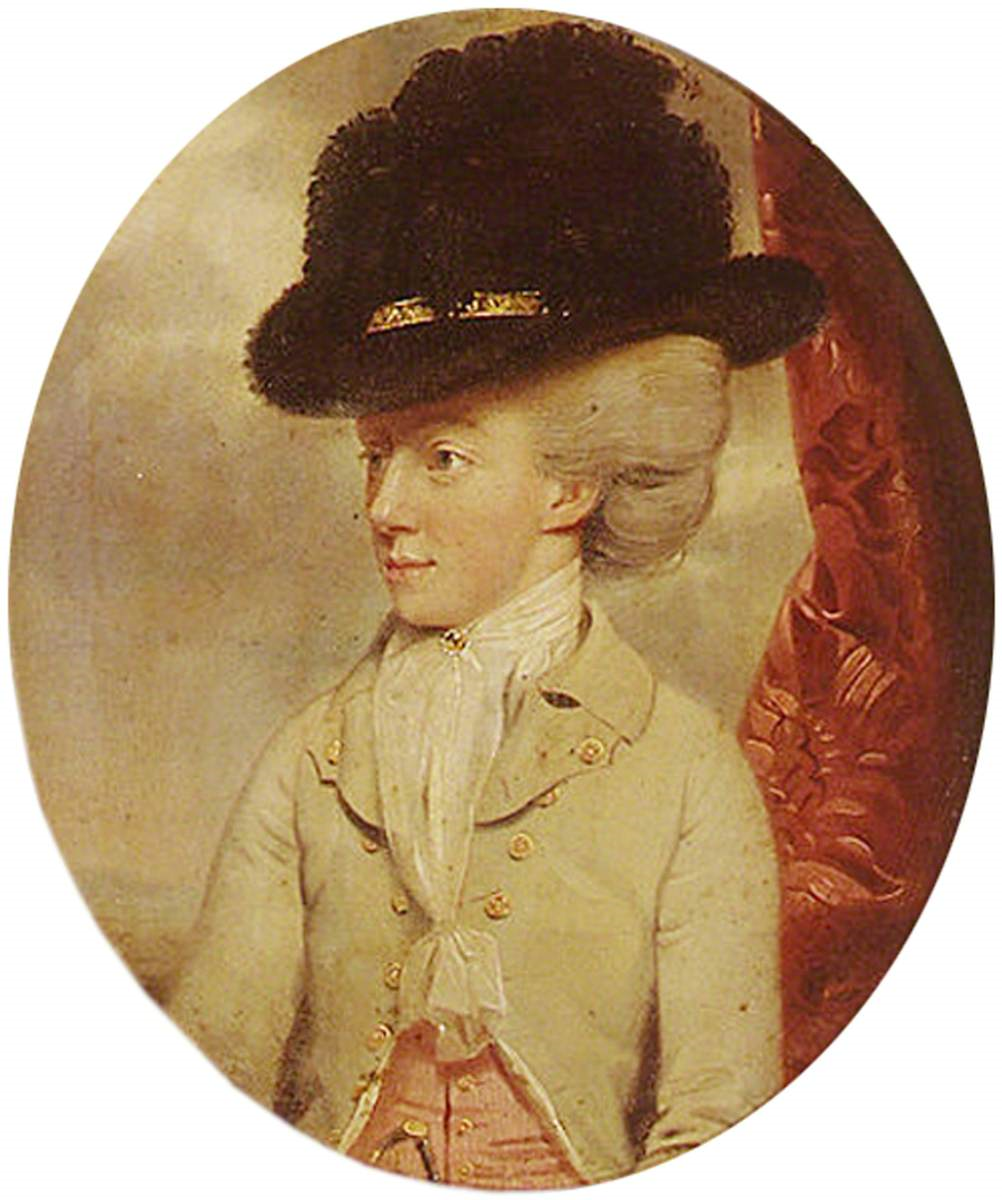
Charity Ourry (1752-1786) wife of Montagu Edmund Parker (d. 1831). Portrait by John Downman (1750-1824), Collection of Parker family, Saltram House, Plympton (now National Trust)

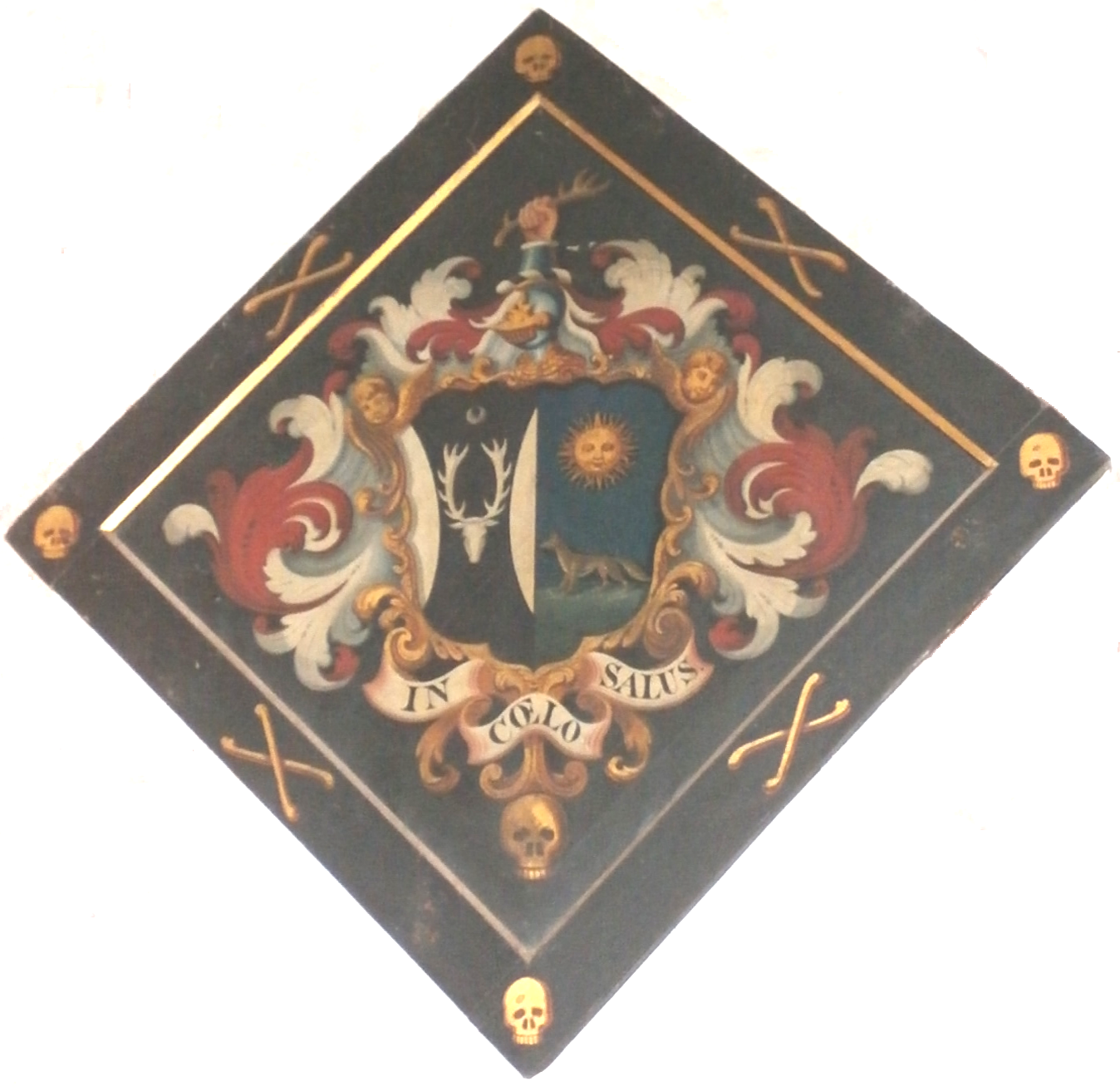
Funerary hatchment of Montagu Edmund Parker (d. 1831) of Whiteway and Blagdon, St John's Church, Paignton, showing the arms of Parker, with a crescent for the difference of a second son, impaling: Azure, a fox statant on grass proper in chief a sun in spendour or (Ourry)

In 1772 he married Charity Ourry (1752–1786), daughter of Admiral Paul Henry Ourry (1719–1783), of Plympton House in the parish of Plympton St Maurice, Devon, MP for Plympton Erle 1763–1775 and Commissioner for Plymouth Dockyard. Paul Ourry was the second son of Louis Ourry, a Huguenot refugee from Blois in France who had obtained British citizenship in 1713 and a commission in the British army. Charity Ourry's mother was Charity Treby, daughter of George II Treby of Plympton House. By his wife he had two sons:

- Montagu Edmund Parker II (d.1831), who survived his father, having in 1806 married Harriet Newcombe, a daughter of John Newcombe of Starcross. He left progeny 2 sons and 1 daughter:
  - Montagu Edmund Newcombe Parker (1807-1858), eldest son and heir and heir to his grandfather, of Whiteway, MP for South Devon. He died without progeny and his monument survives in Exeter Cathedral.
  - John Parker (d.1847), 2nd son, who in 1841 married Lady Catherine Caroline Leslie, daughter of George Leslie and Henrietta Leslie, 14th Countess of Rothes. Lady Catherine died in 1844. Left one daughter, Louisa Harriet, who died in 1852 at age 9.
  - Harriet Sophia Parker, who in 1842 married as her second husband Edmund Parker, 2nd Earl of Morley (1810–1864), her second cousin, and was the mother of Albert Parker, 3rd Earl of Morley.
- Francis Parker (b. 1782), likely died before 1823.

== Death ==
He died in January 1813. There is a will listed for probate in 1814 in Chudleigh. His funeral appears to have taken place at St John's Church, Paignton, then the parish church of his secondary residence at Blagdon, as his funerary hatchment survives in that church, affixed high up on the south wall of the nave. It displays the arms of Parker (with a crescent for the difference of a second son) impaling Azure, a fox statant on grass proper in chief a sun in spendour or (Ourry, the last two words being canting). Above is the crest of Parker: A cubit arm erect vested azure cuffed argent the hand holding a stag's antler proper. Below is the Latin epitaph In Caelo Salus ("Salvation is in Heaven"). Below is a skull. The frame is decorated with skulls and crossbones. The public house in Collaton St Mary (next to Blagdon and also owned by Parker) is called the "Parkers Arms" (sic) after the tenure of the Parker family.
