= Bishop's Palace, Paignton =

Medieval building in Devon, England

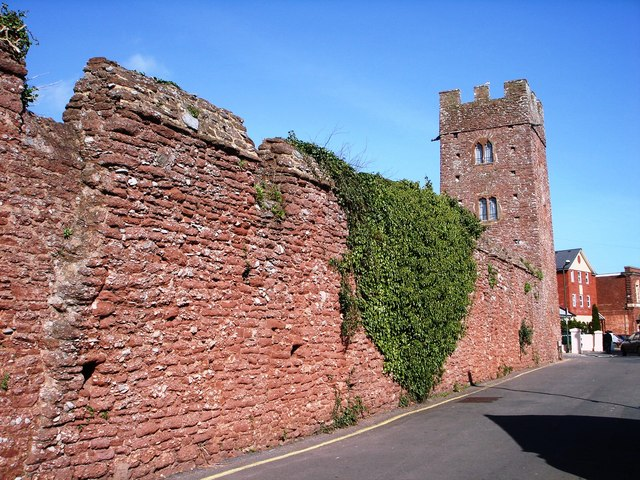
- Boundary Wall and Coverdale's Tower

- Location within Devon
- 50.436126°N 3.569812°W
- Type: Bishop's Palace
- Location: Paignton

Site notes
- Area: Devon

Scheduled monument
- Designated: 22 Nov 1950
- Reference no.: 1020764

The Bishop's Palace in Paignton was the manorial centre and occasional residence of the bishops of Exeter in the town from the 11th century until the early 16th century. The remains of the palace stand beside the parish church of St John the Baptist. The site is defined as a scheduled monument by Historic England, with the standing medieval walls and the C14th Century corner tower, sometimes called Coverdale's Tower, being Listed Grade II*. The curtain wall has battlements and may have been built by Bishop John Grandisson in response to the French raids that took place on Devon during the Hundred Years' War. Within the walls are the fragmentary remnants of the palace chapel (Listed Grade II) along with a Grade II Listed vicarage of the 20th Century.

The palace was originally surrounded by a private deer park. The name "Coverdale's Tower" arose from the erroneous idea that the tower was associated with the English Reformation theologian Myles Coverdale. It has sometimes also been called the "Bible Tower". In the nineteenth century the tower was restored and the quadrangle within the palace walls was laid out with tennis courts.
