= Collaton St Mary =

Village in Devon, England

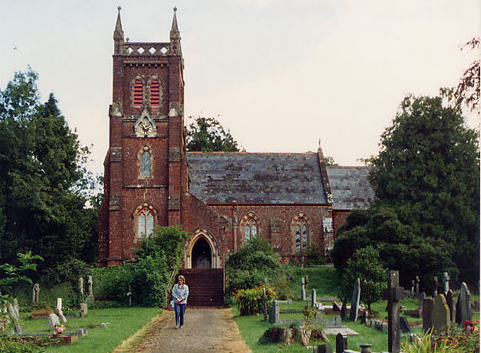
St Mary's church, Collaton St Mary

Collaton St Mary (before 1864 Collaton Kirkham) is a village, parish and former manor in Devon, England, situated about 2 miles (3 km) west of the town of Paignton. The village is bisected by the A385 Paignton to Totnes road. The parish is now administered within the unitary authority of Torbay, Devon.

The parish church, the Church of St Mary, a grade II* listed building was built in 1864-6 by Rev. J.R. Hogg, lord of the manor of nearby Blagdon, in memory of his daughter who died in 1864. It was one of several new churches built in the 19th century which served the needs of the expanding town of Paignton.

Collaton St Mary takes its name from Hogg's daughter, Mary Maxwell Hogg, who was the granddaughter of Henry Francis Lyte. In adding to Blagdon Manor, the also lived at Berry Head House.

The village Pub is called the Parker's Arms after the Parker family, the manor of Blagdon having been purchased by Montagu Edmund Parker (1737–1831) (later of Whiteway House, near Chudleigh), Sheriff of Devon in 1789 and a younger brother of John Parker, 1st Baron Boringdon (1735-1788) of Saltram House, Plympton.

== History ==
The manor is not listed in the Domesday Book of 1086, as it was a sub-manor of the manor of Paignton, the 18th of the 24 Devonshire holdings of the Bishop of Exeter listed in the Domesday Book. It is first recorded in surviving records in the Book of Fees (circa 1302) as Colethon.

Since then the name of the manor and village (alias Coletone, Coleton, etc.) has changed many times, dependent on the surname of its holders, the first suffix being Coleton Clavill (or Colaton Clavell), after the Claville family. Walter I de Claville (floruit 1086) (alias de Clarville and Latinised to de Clavilla) was an Anglo-Norman magnate and one of the 52 Devon Domesday Book tenants-in-chief of King William the Conqueror. He also held lands in Dorset. His Devonshire estates later formed part of the feudal barony of Gloucester. The subsequent holder was the Dennis family, Latinized to Dacus, "the Dane/Danish", which had branches at Orleigh and at Holcombe Burnell, also in Devon. It later became known as Collaton-Kirkham, after the Kirkham family of Blagdon. During the reign of King Edward I (1272-1307) Sir Nicholas Kirkham, Sheriff of Devon in 1308/9, of Ashcombe, married Agatha Dennis, sister and heiress of Sir Robert Dennis (d.pre-1307) of Blagdon, and following the death of Sir Robert Dennis the manor of Blagdon and others including Colaton-Clavil, passed to the Kirkham family, which shortly thereafter moved their seat to Blagdon. The Kirkham family held it for many generations. Finally the name changed to Collaton St Mary, when it became an ecclesiastical parish. The parish was created in 1864 and the foundation stone of St Mary's church was laid on 21 September of that year.
