= Blagdon, Paignton =

Historic manor in Devon, England

Coordinates: 50.4305°N 3.6122°W

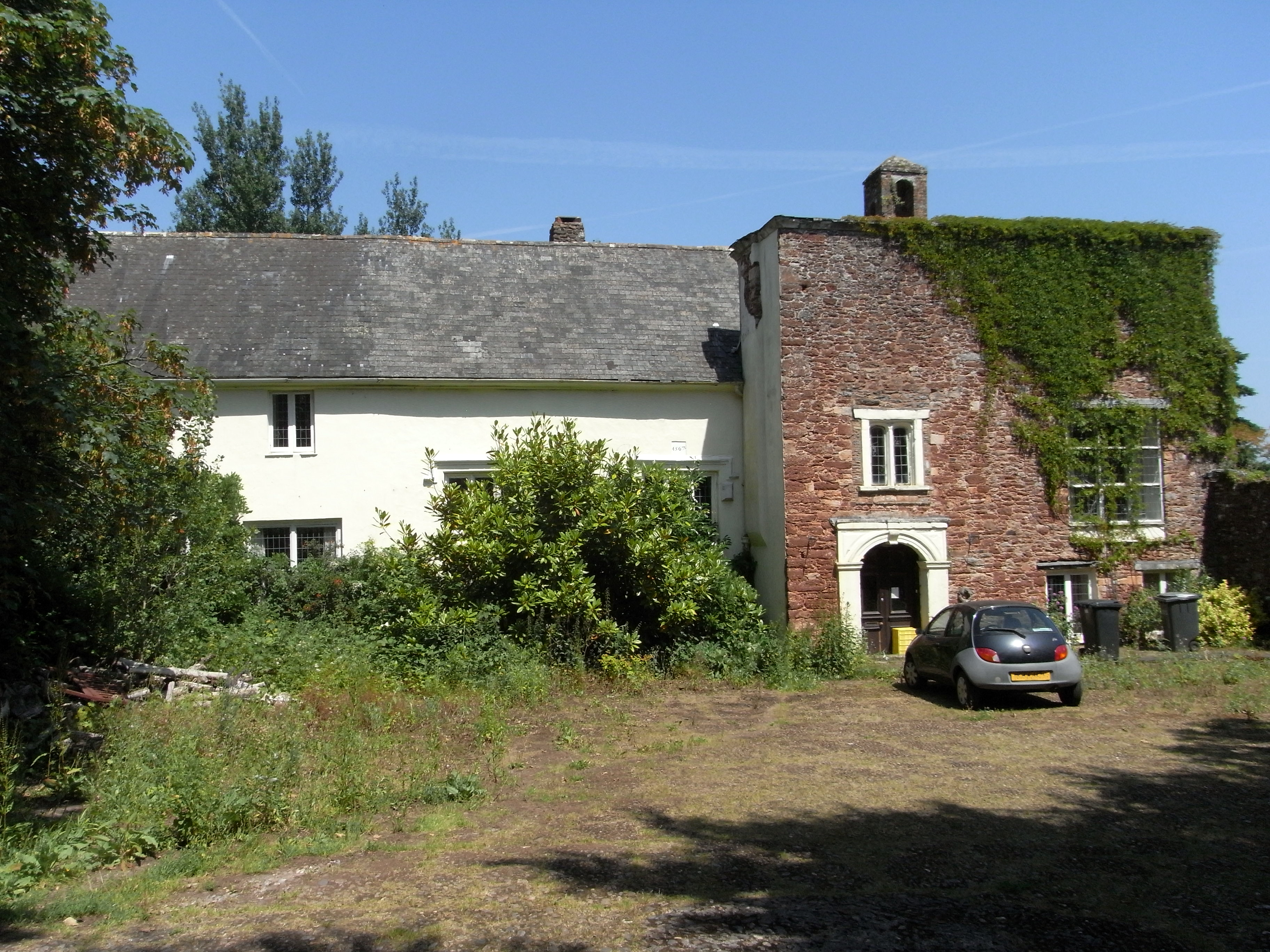
Blagdon Manor House in 2017.

The great hall, Blagdon Manor house

Blagdon historically in the parish of Paignton in Devon, England (today in the parish of Collaton St Mary), is a historic Manor, the seat of the Kirkham family from the 13th to 17th centuries. The manor house known as Blagdon Manor (House) (or Blagdon Barton) survives as a grade II* listed building about two miles west of the historic centre of the town of Paignton, situated behind the "Blagdon Inn" public house (former stables), and almost surrounded by the "Devon Hills Holiday Park" of caravans and mobile homes, set-back at the end of a short driveway off the A385 Paignton to Totnes road. The settlements or farms of Higher Blagdon, Middle Blagdon and Lower Blagdon are situated to the north of the manor house.

In the ancient Church of St John, the parish church of Paignton, survives the Kirkham Chantry Chapel, occupying the south transept, "without a doubt the chief interest of the church", consisting of an elaborately sculpted stone screen erected by the Kirkham family of Blagdon, towards the end of the 15th century, with a further 17th century monument.

== Descent ==
=== Dennis ===
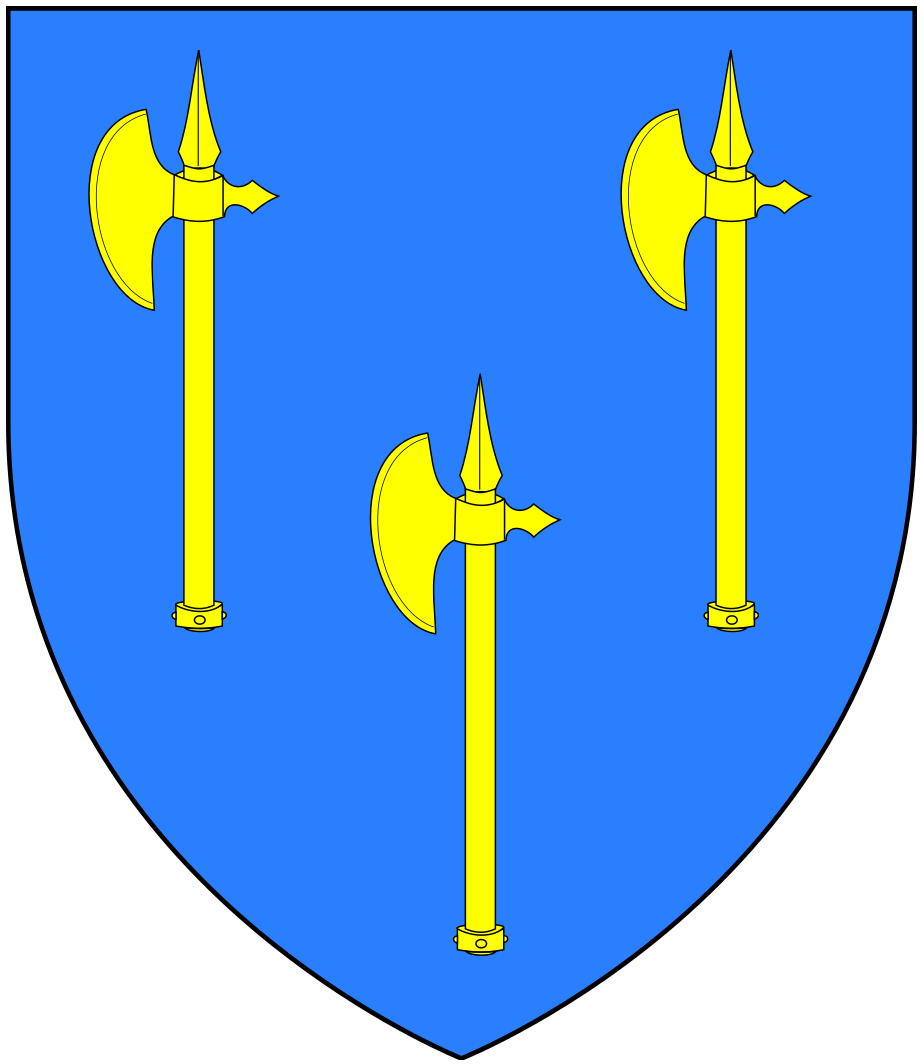
Arms of Dennis of Pancras Week, Blagdon and Orleigh

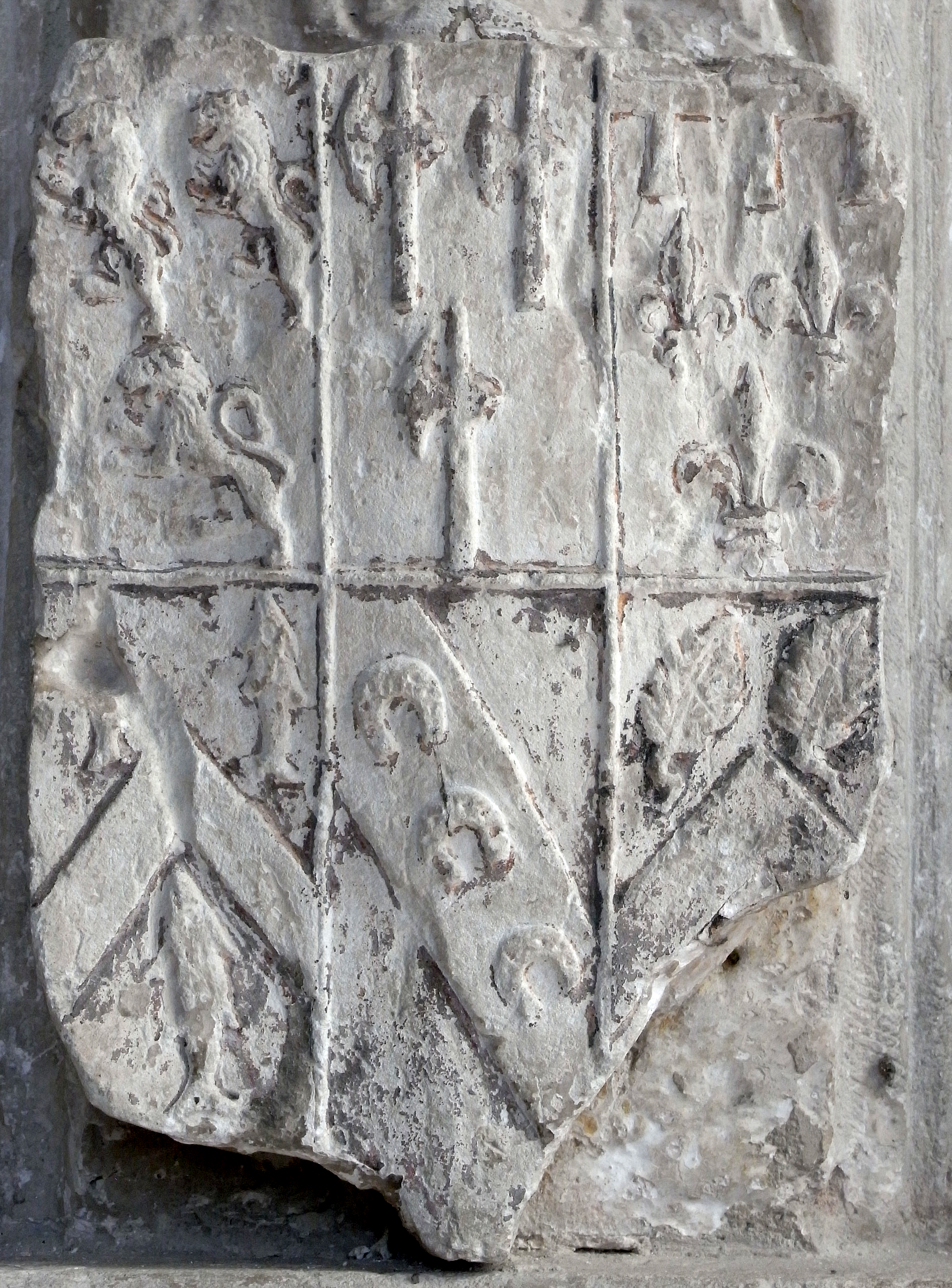
16th c. shield of six quarters surviving in the Kirkham Chantry: 1:Kirkham; 2:Dennis; 3:Scobhull; 4:Waye; 5:Ferrers; 6:Malherbe

The Dennis family had been seated at Pancras Week in the parish of Bradworthy, Devon, since before the reign of King Henry II (1154–1189). The holder during that reign was Raph Dennis, whose second son William Dennis founded the line of Dennis of Orleigh, in North Devon. The family was of Danish origin and at the start of the age of heraldry (c.1200-1215) adopted for their arms: Azure, three Danish battle axes or. The name was created in Anglo-Norman French as le Daneis ("the Dane") and was Latinized as Dacus ("Danish"), being the adjectival form of the noun Dacia, mediaeval Latin for "Denmark".

==== Sir Henry Dennis ====
Sir Henry Dennis of Pancras Week and Blagdon (son and heir of Sir Robert Dennis of Pancras Week), left three children:

- Sir Robert Dennis (fl.1272/1307), son and heir, died without issue and bequeathed his estates to his two sisters:
- Margaret Dennis, who married Sir Reginald Ferrers of Bere Ferrers in Devon, who inherited Pancras Week;
- Agatha Dennis, who married Sir Nicholas Kirkham, who inherited Blagdon and Collaton Clavill (known as Collaton Kirkham until about 1630, now Collaton St Mary).

=== Kirkham ===
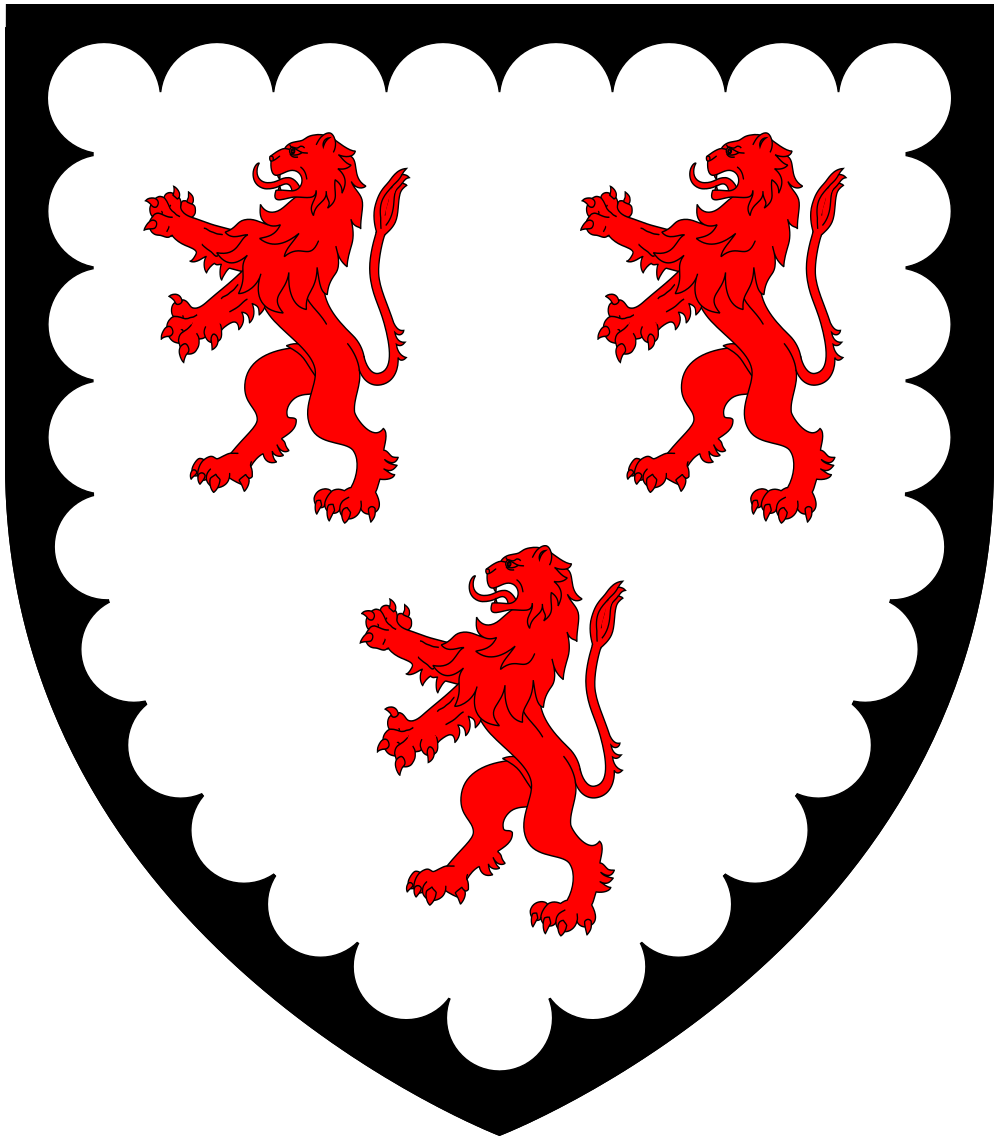
Arms of Kirkham

==== Robert Kirkham (fl.1417) ====
The earliest descendant of Sir Nicholas Kirkham and Agatha Dennis recorded in the Heraldic Visitations of Devon is Robert Kirkham (fl.1417), who married Agnes, a daughter of Sir William Hankford (c. 1350 – 1423) of Annery in Devon, Chief Justice of the King's Bench.

==== Robert Kirkham (died 1443) ====
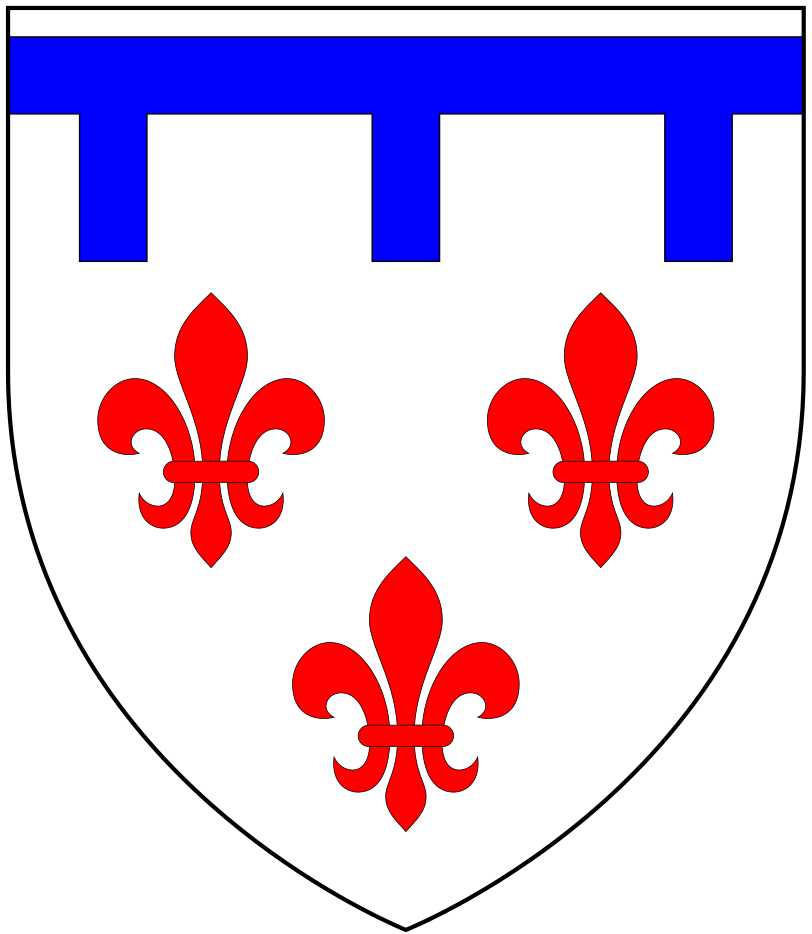
Arms of Scobhull

Robert Kirkham (died 1443), son and heir, who married Elizabeth Scobhull, widow of Robert Trebell and daughter and heiress of Sir Robert Scobhull (alias Scobhill, Scobhul, Scobbahull, etc.) of Scobhull in the parish of South Pool near Kingsbridge, Devon. The arms of Scobhull (Argent, three fleurs-de-lys gules a label of three points azure) were quartered by Kirkham.

==== Robert Kirkham ====
Robert Kirkham (1432–1451), eldest son and heir, aged 11 at his father's death. He died childless aged 19.

==== Nicholas Kirkham (1433/4 – 1516) ====
Nicholas Kirkham (1433/4 – 1516), younger brother, whose effigy survives in the Kirkham Chantry, which he is believed to have built. He married Jane Waye, daughter and heiress of Robert Waye of Marsh in the parish of Newton St Cyres, Devon. His daughter Margaret Kirkham married three times, into various prominent Devon families, firstly to John Cheney of Pinhoe, whose sister Cecily Cheney was the mother of Sir William Courtenay (1477–1535) "The Great" of Manor of Powderham. His second son Nicholas Kirkham inherited his mother's manor of Marsh and married Katherine Bonville, a daughter of John Bonville, bastard son of the magnate William Bonville, 1st Baron Bonville (1391–1461), of Chewton, Somerset.

==== Sir John Kirkham (1472–1529) ====
Arms of Sir John Kirkham (1472–1529) impaling Moore, symbolising his first marriage. Cullompton Church

Sir John Kirkham (1472–1529), eldest son and heir, Sheriff of Devon in 1523/4. According to the Devonshire biographer Prince (died 1723), he was a "very free and liberal, ... prudent and discreet" benefactor of the town of Honiton in Devon. He married four times:

- Firstly to a daughter of the Moore family of Moor Hayes in the parish of Cullompton in Devon. The marriage was childless but is memorialised on one of the sculpted oak heraldic shields on the parclose screen of the Moorehayes Chapel of Cullompton Church, displaying Kirkham impaling Moore (Ermine, on a chevron azure three cinquefoils or).
- Secondly to a daughter of Sir Thomas Fulford (died 1489) of Great Fulford in the parish of Dunsford, Devon, by his wife Phillipa Courtenay, a daughter of Sir Philip Courtenay (died 1463) of Powderham (by his wife Elizabeth Hungerford, daughter of Walter Hungerford, 1st Baron Hungerford (died 1449), KG). They had no children.
- Thirdly to Luce Tremayle, a daughter of Sir Thomas Tremayle, by whom he had issues, including his son and heir Thomas Kirkham (1504-1551/2).
- Fourthly to Jane Mathew, daughter and heiress of William Mathew of Milton, without issue.

==== Thomas Kirkham (1504-1551/2) ====
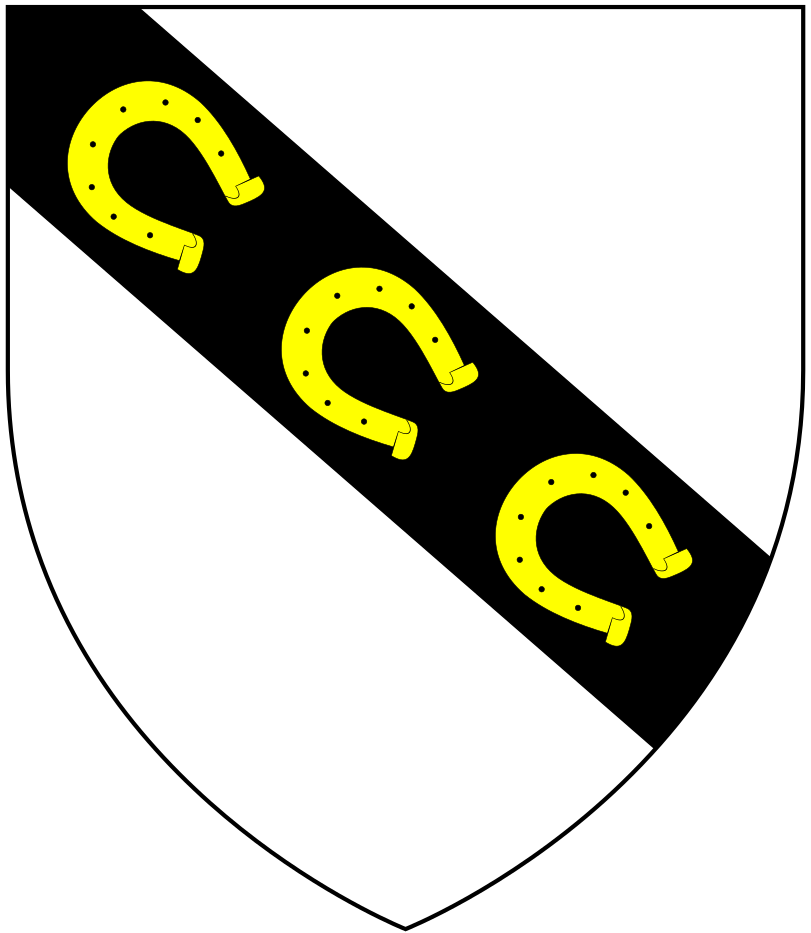
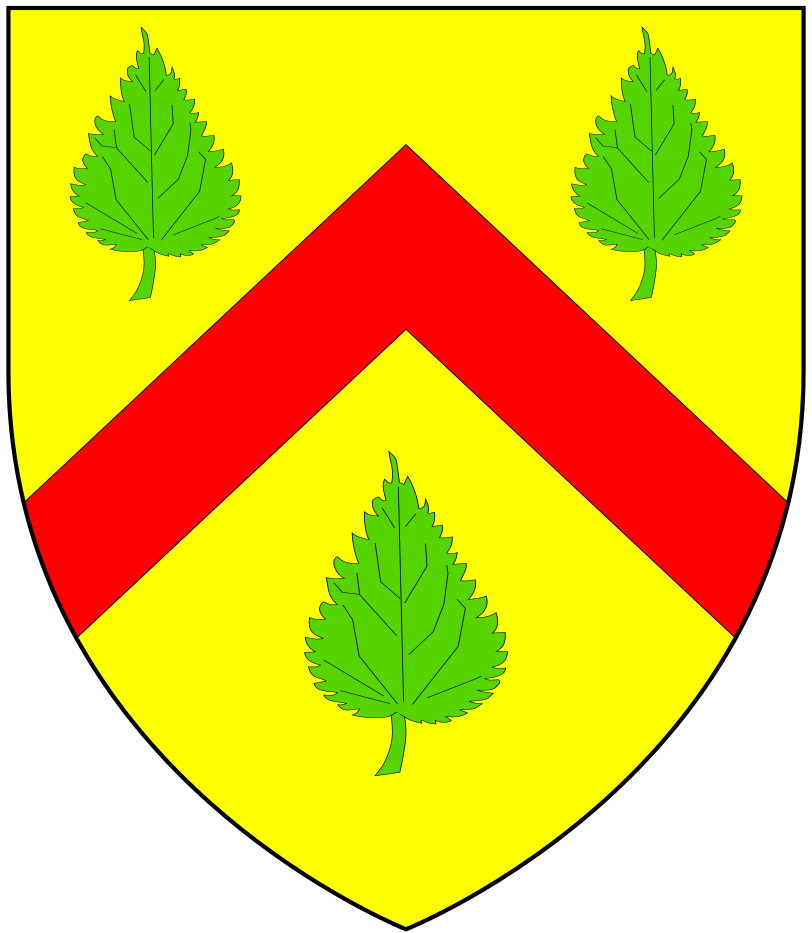
Arms of Ferrers and Malherbe, 5th and 6th quarters of the 16th c. shield of six quarters surviving in the Kirkham Chantry

Thomas Kirkham (1504-1551/2), eldest son and heir, who married twice:

- Firstly to Margaret Ferrers, daughter and heiress of Richard Ferrers by his wife Jane Malherbe, daughter and heiress of Sir John Malherbe, whose arms were: Or, a chevron gules between three nettle leaves erect proper. The marriage is commemorated in the 5th and 6th quarters (Ferrers and Malherbe) of the 16th c. shield of six quarters surviving in the Kirkham Chantry. By his first marriage he had children including George Kirkham (1525-1581/2), eldest son and heir.
- Secondly he married Thomasine (or Cicily) Carew, only daughter (and heiress in her issue) of Sir William Carew (born 1483) of Mohuns Ottery in Devon, by his wife Joane Courtenay, a daughter of Sir William Courtenay (died 1485) of Powderham, Sheriff of Devon in 1483, by his wife Margaret Bonville, daughter of William Bonville, 1st Baron Bonville (died 1461). His daughter from this marriage was Thomasine Kirkham, heiress of Mohuns Ottery, who married Thomas Southcott.

==== George Kirkham (1525-1581/2) ====
George Kirkham (1525-1581/2), eldest son and heir, who was the builder of the surviving Blagdon manor house, as is evidenced by a datestone inscribed "1567" on the external wall of the great hall. He married Margaret Dennis, a daughter of Sir Thomas Dennis (c. 1477–1561) of Holcombe Burnell, near Exeter in Devon, Sheriff of Devon nine times between 1507/8 to 1553/4 and a Member of Parliament for Devon (apparently a junior branch of Dennis of Orleigh, which used a differenced version of the arms of Dennis of Orleigh). He died without surviving issue, having had a daughter Elizabeth, who died unmarried and was said by Prince to have been a dwarf. His heir was his nephew Sir William Kirkham (died 1623).

==== Sir William Kirkham (died 1623) ====
Monument in the Kirkham Chantry of the Church of St John The Baptist, Paignton, to Sir William Kirkham

Effigy of Sir William Kirkham, Kirkham Chantry

Sir William Kirkham (died 1623), nephew, son of Richard Kirkham of Pinhoe in Devon by his wife Agnes Cape of Somerset. He married (as his second wife) Mary Tichbourne (died 1627), a daughter of Peter Tichbourne of Hampshire and a sister of Chidiock Tichbourne (1562–1586), a conspirator and poet. By Mary he had 8 sons and 4 daughters, the second son being Francis Kirkham who married the heiress of Roope of Bidwell, Newton St Cyres, and founded the line of Kirkham of Bidwell. His kneeling effigy, dressed in armour with neck-ruff and bareheaded, survives in the Kirkham Chantry, facing that of his wife. Between the figures is a column on which is sculpted at top a sunburst inscribed with the letters "IHS" below which is inscribed "SPES ET" ("hope and"), below which is a crown, the browband of which is inscribed "CORONA" ("crown"), below which is a pair of hearts overlapping. At the base of the central column is a heraldic shield sculpted with six quarters, apparently not in its original position. The two outermost columns are each decorated with four heraldic shields, seven of which have been chiselled flat and unintelligible. The only arms still visible are on the top left shield, showing Kirkham impaling a field vair, but with the chief chiselled flat. On top of all three columns is a putto, with wings folded over his chest, but with face features chiselled away. The monument was "covered with plaster" until 1753, when on its removal the following inscription was revealed (since disappeared):

Memoriae sacrum in obitum ornatissimi viri Gulielmi Kirkham Equitis Aurati ("Sacred to the memory into death of the most illustrious man William Kirkham, Knight Bachelor").

"This worthy knight whose corps entombed lie
Hath and deserves a noble memory
Heaven crowns his soul with bliss, the earth with praise,
His life, his death, God gave him happy days
Gave him the gifts of nature, generous arts
Wit, judgement, learning, knowledge, his deserts
Got good men's love; his will his conscience free
From wronging any; wisdom, equity
Were guides unto his actions to the poor
His bounty great his council & his store
Ready to succour all his worth was such
Envy may strive to hurt but cannot touch"

==== Richard Kirkham (died 1631) ====
Richard Kirkham (died 1631), eldest son and heir, who married "the heiress of Oldham" near Tilbury in Essex, and left a daughter and sole heiress Mary Kirkham, who married Sir George Blount, 2nd Baronet (died 1667) of Sodington in the parish of Mamble in Worcestershire, to whom the manor of Blagdon passed.

=== Blount ===
Arms of Blount

==== Sir George Blount, 2nd Baronet (died 1667) ====
Sir George Blount, 2nd Baronet (died 1667) of Sodington in the parish of Mamble in Worcestershire, married Mary Kirkham, heiress of Blagdon. His eldest son Sir Walter Kirkham Blount, 3rd Baronet (died 1717), inherited his paternal estates, including Sodington. "The Blounts were notable for their faithful adherence to the Roman Catholic faith, and they gave the most zealous support to the Crown in the Civil War". Mary Kirkham bequeathed Blagdon to her third son Edward Blount (died 1726).

==== Edward Blount (died 1726) ====
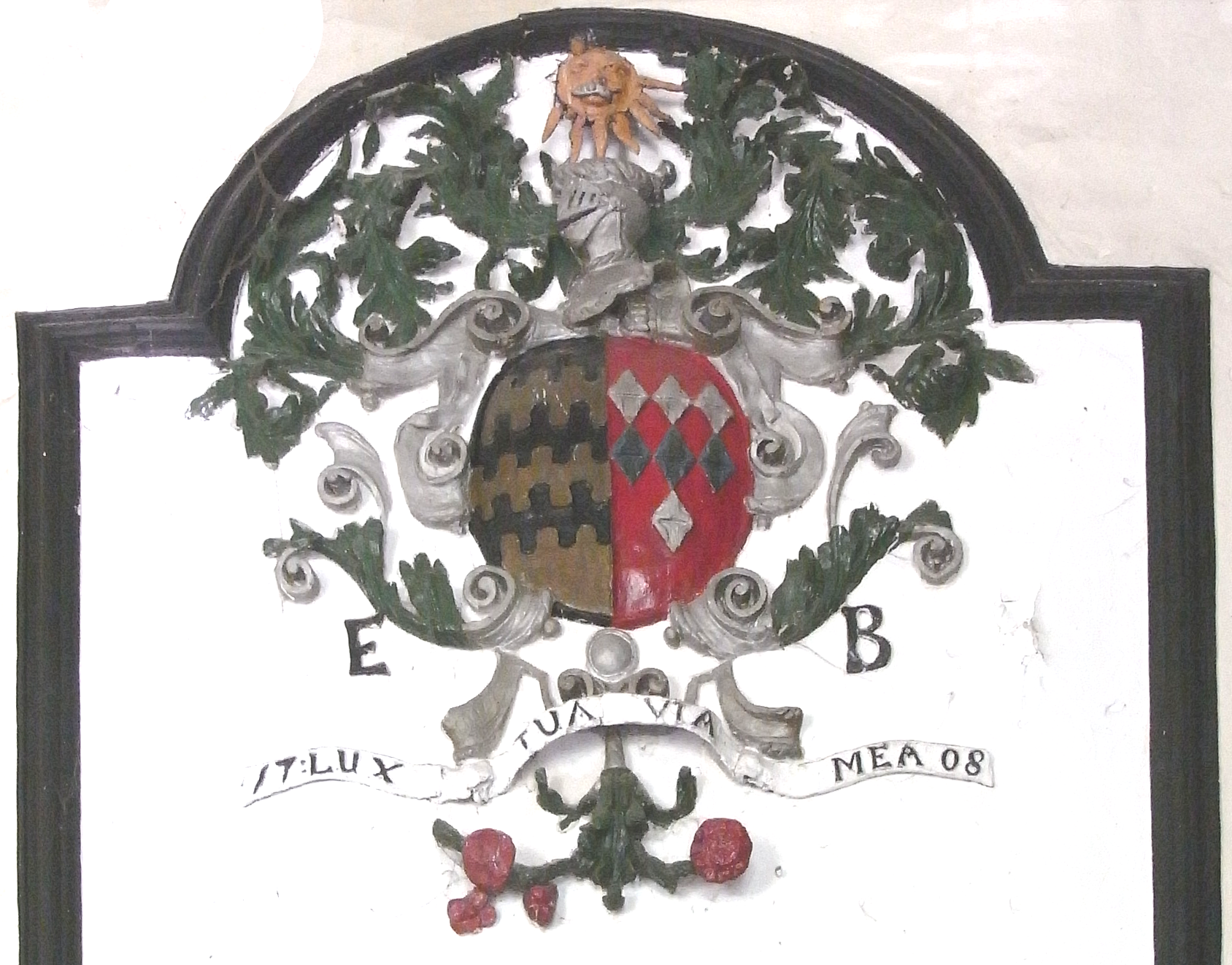
1708 heraldic overmantle in great hall of Blagdon House showing arms of Blount

Edward Blount (died 1726) of Blagdon, third son, who inherited his maternal estates. As a Roman Catholic he was associated with the Howard family, Dukes of Norfolk, the leading Catholic family in England. On 6 June 1716, together with Lord George Howard, (died 1721), the eldest half-brother of Henry Howard, 7th Duke of Norfolk (1655–1701), he "successfully petitioned the House of Lords for counsel to argue against provisions in the Papists' Estates Bill, read 18th May 1716, which threatened to ruin their credit". Shortly thereafter Edward Blount went into exile with his family in Bruges, but had returned to England by 1721. In 1708 Edward Blount married Anne Guise, a daughter of Sir John Guise, 2nd Baronet (c. 1654–1695) of Elmore in Gloucestershire, which marriage was commemorated by the surviving heraldic overmantel above the fireplace of the great hall of Blagdon manor house. This shows the initials "EB" and displays the arms of Blount (Barry nebuly of six or and sable) impaling Gules, seven mascles vair 3,3,1 (Guise) above a scroll inscribed with a Latin motto Lux Tua Via Mea ("Your light is my path") with the date "1708". In 1717 "Edward Blount of Blagdon" registered his landholdings under the Registration of Papists' Estates, legislation passed following the Jacobite uprising of 1715. Edward Blount was a friend and patron of the poet Alexander Pope (1688–1744), and much correspondence between the two men during the years 1714-25 survives. Both were Roman Catholics. Edward Blount left four daughters as his co-heiresses:

- Elizabeth Blount (died 1778), eldest daughter, wife of Hugh Clifford, 3rd Baron Clifford of Chudleigh (1700–1732), of Ugbrooke House in Devon.
- Henrietta Blount (died 1782), second daughter, who married twice: firstly to Peter Proli of Antwerp; secondly in 1739 (as his second wife) to Philip Howard (1687/8-1749/50) of Buckenham Tofts in Norfolk (younger brother of her brother-in-law Edward Howard, 9th Duke of Norfolk).
- Mary Blount (1701/2-1773), third daughter, who in 1727 married Edward Howard, 9th Duke of Norfolk.
- Anne, who joined a religious order

=== Parker ===
Arms of Parker

==== Francis Parker (1701-post 1757) ====
Blagdon remained a seat of the Blount family until it was acquired as his residence by Francis Parker (born 1701-post 1757), the fourth son of George Parker (1651–1743) of Boringdon Hall, Plympton, and of North Molton, Devon, who purchased Saltram near Plymouth, later the principal seat of his descendants. Francis Parker of Blagdon left three daughters including:

- Anne Parker, who married the banker John Baring (1730–1816), MP, of Mount Radford near Exeter, eldest brother of Sir Francis Baring, 1st Baronet. In 1757 her father (as "Francis Parker of Blagdon") entered into a marriage settlement on her behalf.
- Elizabeth Parker, who married firstly to Thomas Baring of Larkbear, near Exeter, a younger brother of her sister's husband John Baring (1730–1816); secondly to William Spicer of Wear, thirdly to John Fryer of Exeter.

==== John Parker (1703-1768) ====
Francis's heir was his elder brother John Parker (1703–1768) of Boringdon Hall, Plympton, and Saltram House, who in 1725 married Catherine Poulett (1706–1758), a daughter of John Poulett, 1st Earl Poulett, by his wife Bridget Bertie a granddaughter of Montagu Bertie, 2nd Earl of Lindsey. In 1763 John Parker leased Blagdon and other lands to his wife's relatives as is recorded on a deed in the Plymouth and West Devon Record Office summarised as follows:

"Lease for a year: 1) John Parker of Boringdon, esquire, eldest son and heir of George Parker, deceased. 2) Vere Poulett of Twickenham, Middx, esquire, and Ann Poulett of Albemarle Street, Westminster, esquire. Barton lands of Blagdon, Newparks, Oldaways and the Downs. Also manor of Collaton. Also lands of Edward Blount, deceased, in Paignton, Marldon and Stoke Gabriel. Also barton of Polsloe and two closes of land called Higher Bowmore and Lower Bowmore, parcel of Martyns tenement, Heavitree. Also barton of Oakhay alias Okey Place, Stoke Canon. Also all other lands in Paignton, Marldon, Stoke Canon, Heavitree and Stoke Gabriel that passed to John Parker as heir of Francis Parker. Also 1/8th of Herdwick alias Hardwick".

==== Montagu Edmund Parker (1737–1813) ====
As John Parker's eldest son John Parker, 1st Baron Boringdon (1735–1788) inherited his paternal estates (North Molton, Boringdon and Saltram, etc.), Blagdon and Collaton Kirkham descended to John Parker's second son Montagu Edmund Parker. A Funerary hatchment to him survives in St John's Church, Paignton.

The public house in Collaton St Mary is called the "Parkers Arms" (sic) after the tenure of the Parker family.

=== Hogg ===
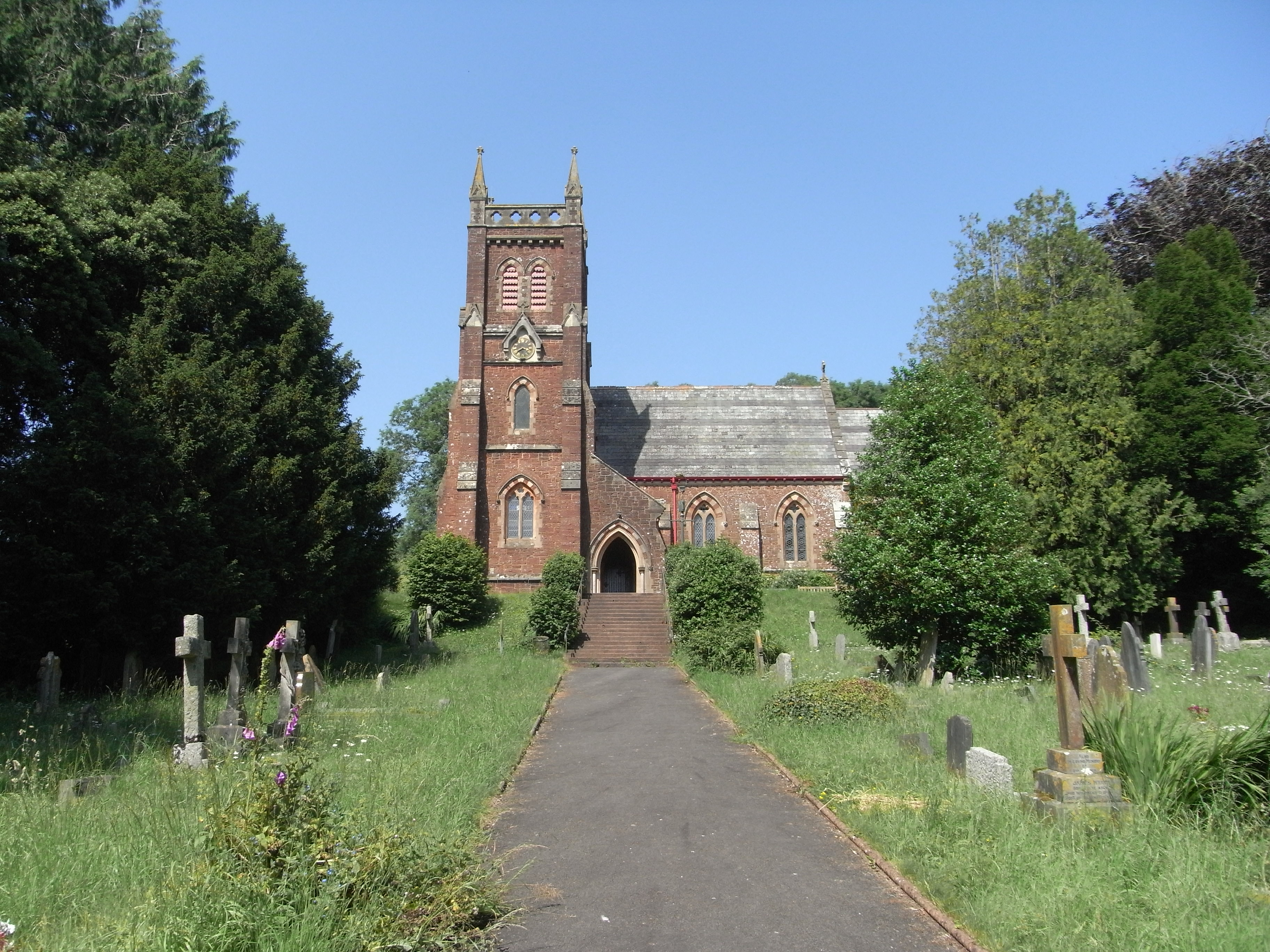
St Mary's Church, Collaton St Mary, built in 1864 by Rev. Hogg of Blagdon

In 1864 Rev. John Roughton Hogg (1811–1867), of Blagdon, Vicar of Torwood, a Justice of the Peace for Devon, (second son of Rev. James Hogg, Vicar of Geddington, Northamptonshire, and master of Kettering grammar school), commenced building (at his sole expense) the "evocative Victorian group" (Pevsner) of church, school and vicarage at the adjoining manor of Collaton (thenceforth "Collaton St Mary"), to the design of J.W.Rowell, to commemorate his daughter Mary Maxwell Hogg (died 1864), who died aged 17 and was buried at Brixham and re-interred in his new church in 1867. His diary between 1859 and 1862 survives in the Devon Archives. Hogg's wife was Anna Maria Maxwell Lyte (1822–1889), only daughter of Rev. Henry Francis Lyte (1793–1847), of nearby Berry Head, Brixham, who composed the well-known hymns "Abide with me", "Praise my soul the King of Heaven" and "Pleasant are thy courts above". The inscribed Hogg Memorial erected by him in 1867 and situated 6 metres south of the chancel wall, is a grade II listed structure made of white Italian marble on red breccia base with a marble cross on a 3-tier plinth with breccia base with red breccia kerbs.

Until that time the parish church of Blagdon had been St John's Church in Paignton, the mediaeval parish church in which is situated the Kirkham Chantry Chapel. Other new churches were built at that time in and around Paignton and Torquay to cater for the greatly expanded populations due to the development of the Torbay area as a seaside resort.

== Sources ==
- Pevsner, Nikolaus & Cherry, Bridget, The Buildings of England: Devon, London, 2004, pp. 839, 844
- Pole, Sir William (d.1635), Collections Towards a Description of the County of Devon, Sir John-William de la Pole (ed.), London, 1791, p. 279
- Vivian, Lt.Col. J.L., (Ed.) The Visitations of the County of Devon: Comprising the Heralds' Visitations of 1531, 1564 & 1620, Exeter, 1895, pp. 516–17, pedigree of Kirkham of Blagdon
- Listed building text, Blagdon Manor, PaigntonBlagdon Manor, Paignton, Torbay
