= Rendel =

Rendel is a surname, and may refer to

- Alexander Meadows Rendel (1828–1918), English civil engineer
- David Rendel (1949–2016), British politician
- Emma Rendel (born 1976), Swedish graphic novel author
- George Wightwick Rendel (1833–1902), British engineer and naval architect
- George William Rendel (1889–1979), British diplomat
- Hamilton Owen Rendel (1843–1902), British engineer, designer of the hydraulic system for the Tower Bridge
- James Meadows Rendel (engineer) (1799–1856), British civil engineer
- James Meadows Rendel (geneticist) (1915–2001), Australian agricultural scientist
- Leila Rendel (1882–1969), English social worker, granddaughter of Alexander
- Martin Rendel (born 1968), German academic and cultural manager
- Robert Rendel (1885–1944), British film actor, brother of Leila
- Sandy Rendel (1910–1991), SOE agent
- Stuart Rendel, 1st Baron Rendel (1834–1913), British industrialist, philanthropist and politician

== See also ==
- Rendel (film), a 2017 Finnish superhero film
- Rendell
