= Rendle =

Rendle is a surname. Notable people with the surname include:

- Alfred Barton Rendle (1865–1938), English botanist
- Andrew Rendle (a.k.a. Radio Rendle), British radio presenter
- Luke Rendle, drummer of Theatre of Hate and Crisis
- Sharon Rendle (born 1966), British judoka
- Thomas Rendle (born 1986), British chess master and coach
- Thomas Edward Rendle (1884–1946), English recipient of the Victoria Cross

== See also ==
- Rendel
- Randall (disambiguation)
