= Chinese cruiser Chaoyong =

Chinese Tsukushi-class cruiser

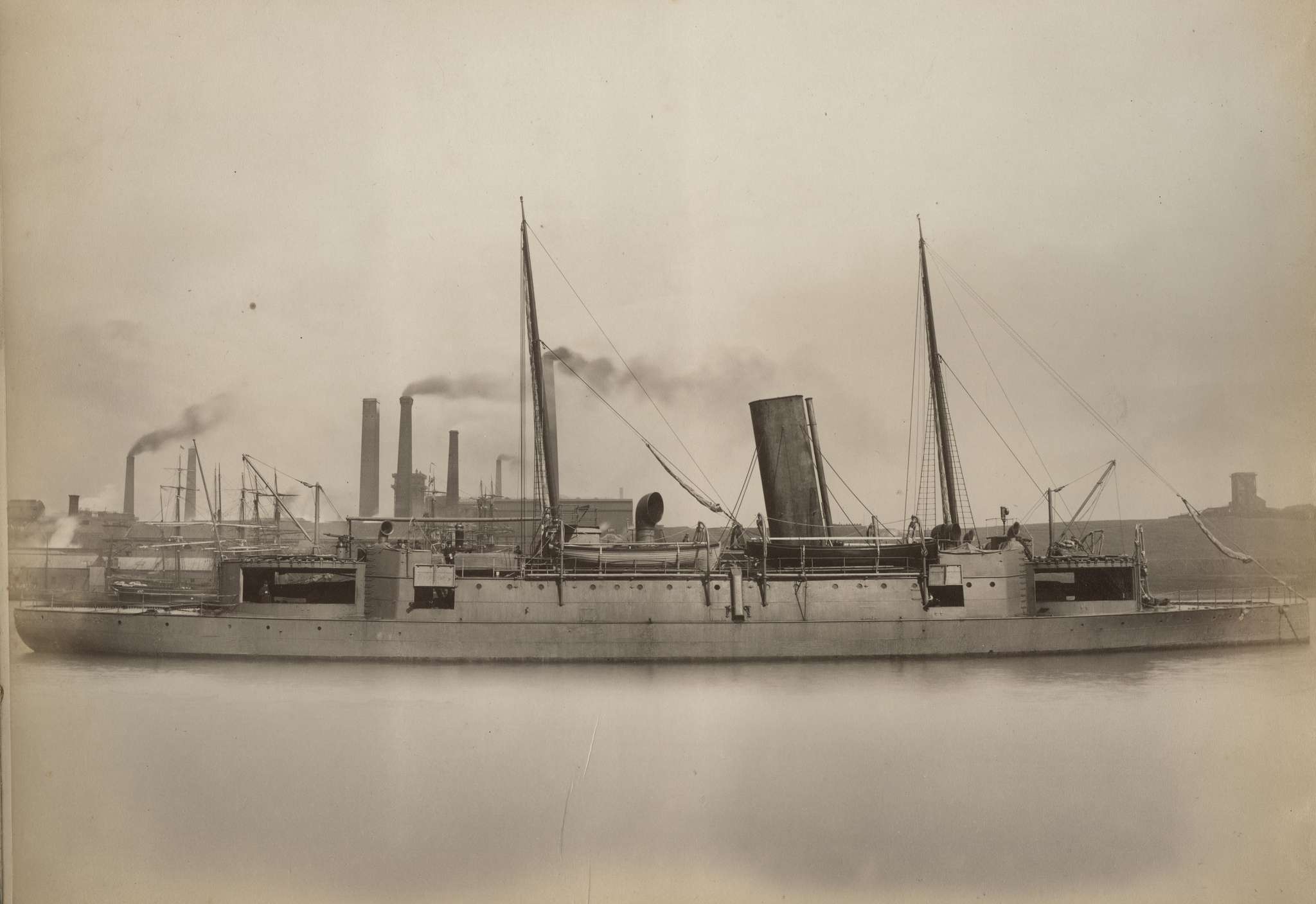
- Chaoyong docked on the River Tyne

History

Imperial China
- Name: Chaoyong
- Ordered: 1879
- Builder: Charles Mitchell & Company, Newcastle Upon Tyne
- Laid down: 15 January 1880
- Launched: 11 November 1880
- Completed: 14 July 1881
- Commissioned: 22 November 1881
- Fate: Sank, 17 September 1894

General characteristics
- Class & type: Tsukushi-class cruiser
- Displacement: 1,350 long tons (1,370 t)
- Length: 220 ft (67 m)
- Beam: 32 ft (9.8 m)
- Draught: 15.5 ft (4.7 m)
- Installed power: 2,580 ihp (1,920 kW)
- Propulsion: Reciprocating engine, two shafts; Six boilers
- Speed: 16 kn (30 km/h; 18 mph)
- Boats & landing craft carried: 2 x Pinnaces
- Complement: 140
- Armament: 2 × Armstrong Whitworth 254 mm (10.0 in) cannons; 4 × Armstrong Whitworth 120 mm (4.7 in) cannons; 2 × twin Armstrong Whitworth 9-pounders; 4 × 11 mm Gatling guns; 4 × 37 mm Hotchkiss guns; 2 × 4-barreled Nordenfelt guns

Chaoyong (Chinese: 超勇; pinyin: Chāoyǒng; Wade–Giles: Ch'ao-yung; lit. 'Valiant') was a cruiser built for the Imperial Chinese Navy. She was built by Charles Mitchell & Company in Newcastle Upon Tyne, England, from a design by Sir George Wightwick Rendel which had already been used on the Chilean Navy vessel Arturo Prat (later the Imperial Japanese Navy's Tsukushi). Two ships were ordered by the Chinese, Chaoyong and Yangwei. Both would serve together throughout their careers, assigned to the Beiyang Fleet and based in Taku during the summer, and Chemulpo, Korea, in the winter.

Chaoyong did not see any action during the Sino-French War, but in the First Sino-Japanese War, she was in the Chinese line at the Battle of Yalu River on 17 September 1894. She was one of the early casualties of the battle, being set alight, and sinking after a collision with the Chinese cruiser Jiyuan.

== Design ==
The design for Chaoyong was advertised by its designer, British naval architect Sir George Wightwick Rendel, as an example of a low-cost cruiser able to withstand larger ironclad warships. The design was later seen as an intermediate concept between his flat-iron gunboats and the protected cruiser. In theory, the ship would rely on its small size and higher speed, along with a higher muzzle velocity main battery to attack larger, less maneuverable ships.

Chaoyong's basic design was initially used on the Chilean Navy vessel Arturo Prat, which preceded it in construction, although several changes were made, including increasing the number of steam boilers from four to six. Both Chaoyong and her sister ship, Yangwei shared the same design, and were built by Charles Mitchell on the River Tyne near Newcastle Upon Tyne. Mitchell had worked alongside Rendel, and was building Arturo Prat. Chaoyang measured 220 feet (67 m) long overall, with a beam of 32 ft (9.8 m) and an average draft of 15.5 ft (4.7 m). The ships were crewed by a complement of 140 sailors. The most significant difference between the two ships was the power output of their reciprocating engines; while Yangwei had an output of 2,580 indicated horsepower (1,920 kilowatts), Chaoyong's engine supplied 2,677 ihp (1,996 kW). This meant that while Yangwei could achieve a speed of 16 knots (30 km/h; 18 mph), Chaoyong could go faster at 16.8 kn (31.1 km/h; 19.3 mph).

They both were constructed out of 0.75 inches (1.9 cm) steel with waterproof bulkhead 3.5 ft (1.1 m) below the waterline, a single smokestack, and twin masts, which could also be used for sails. The prow was reinforced for ramming. They had a number of technical innovations, including hydraulic steering systems and electrical incandescent light fixtures. The main armaments were breech-loading Armstrong Whitworth 254 mm (10.0 in) cannons, one on the bow and one on the stern, mounted in stationary gun shields. These shields were added for weather proofing reasons, but restricted the angle of fire that could be taken, as well as the elevation they could fire at. Chaoyong also had four 5.1 inches (130 mm) inch guns, (two to each side), two 57 mm (2.2 in) long guns, four 11 mm (0.43 in) Gatling guns, four 37 mm (1.5 in) Hotchkiss guns, two 4-barrelled Nordenfeldt guns, as well as two torpedo tubes. Both ships were equipped with two pinnaces, which were each armed with spar torpedoes.

== Career ==
Chinese diplomat Li Hongzhang was made aware of Rendel's designs, and following the start of the construction on Arturo Prat, an order was placed on behalf of the Imperial Chinese Navy for two ships of the same type. Chaoyong was laid down on 15 January 1880, and launched on 4 November. She was subsequently worked up, and was announced as completed on 15 July, a day after her sister ship, Yangwei. They were both completed ahead of Arturo Prat, who instead would enter service as the Imperial Japanese Navy's Tsukushi after Chile cancelled the order following the end of the War of the Pacific.

Each of the Chinese vessels were equipped with Chinese crews, with Western captains and instructors in place. They sailed out of the Tyne River on 9 August, and stopped in Plymouth Sound two days later where Admiral Ding Ruchang joined them to take command of the ships for the journey to China. Following their arrival on 20 October in Hong Kong, they toured Canton (now Guangzhou) and Shanghai, before travelling to the Taku Forts. Chaoyong was boarded by Hongzhang, and the two cruisers took the diplomat to inspect the dredging of the port at Taku (now the Port of Tianjin). Both ships were assigned to the Beiyang Fleet in the north, and Ruchang was placed in command.

On 23 June 1884, Chaoyong was present alongside Yangwei, as well as the corvette Yangwu and the sloop Kangji, when the Chinese vessels met their French Navy counterparts. The French ships dwarfed their Chinese counterparts, and following a discussion between the leaders of each fleet, the French put on a firing demonstration. Afterwards, the Chinese fleet broke up with Yang-Wu headed to Foochow (now Fuzhou), and the two cruisers sailed back to Taku. The Sino-French War broke out shortly afterwards, although Chaoyong saw no action, although there was speculation that the two cruisers might be sent to break the French blockade of Formosa. She and Yangwei were sent south to Shanghai in November, but were then brought back north after concerns were raised about growing Japanese influences in Korea.

=== Battle of Yalu River ===
Following the war, Chaoyong and Yangwei continued to operate together. They operated out of Taku, but since the water froze over during winter, they would spend that part of the year in the Korean port of Chemulpo (now Incheon). During the First Sino-Japanese War in 1894, Chaoyong remained with the fleet and was supporting troop transports when they made contact with a Japanese fleet on the morning of 17 September.

As the Japanese fleet moved in, the Chinese fleet moved away from anchor and attempted for form up in a line. However, the manoeuvre was botched and Chaoyong was one of four ships which ended up behind the others. This was due to a lack of maintenance over the years; with their equipment out of date, they could barely make 10 kn (19 km/h; 12 mph). Orders had been given for the ships to operate in pairs, with Chaoyong and Yangwei teamed together. This battle plan was alien to the premise of their design, inherent in the lack of armour for ships about to fight in the line of battle.

At a distance of 3,000 yd (2,700 m), the Japanese fleet began to fire on the Chaoyong. Within a few minutes, fires broke out, which quickly engulfed the central superstructure with its numerous wooden partitions covered with thick layers of flammable varnish applied over the years. Yangwei quickly suffered the same fate. As the Chaoyong attempted to make way to a nearby island to beach itself, it collided with the Chinese cruiser Jiyuan, before listing to starboard and sinking in shallow water nearby. Some of the crew were rescued by a Chinese torpedo boat engaged in the battle.
