= James Dobson (disambiguation) =

James Dobson (1936–2025) was an American evangelical Christian psychologist and founder of Focus on the Family.

James or Jim Dobson may also refer to:

- James Murray Dobson (1846–1924), British principal engineer of the Buenos Aires harbour works in the late 1880s
- Jim Dobson (ice hockey) (born 1960), Canadian ice hockey player
- Jim Dobson (baseball) (1939–2018)
- James Dobson (actor) (1920–1987), American actor
