= Japanese cruiser Tsukushi =

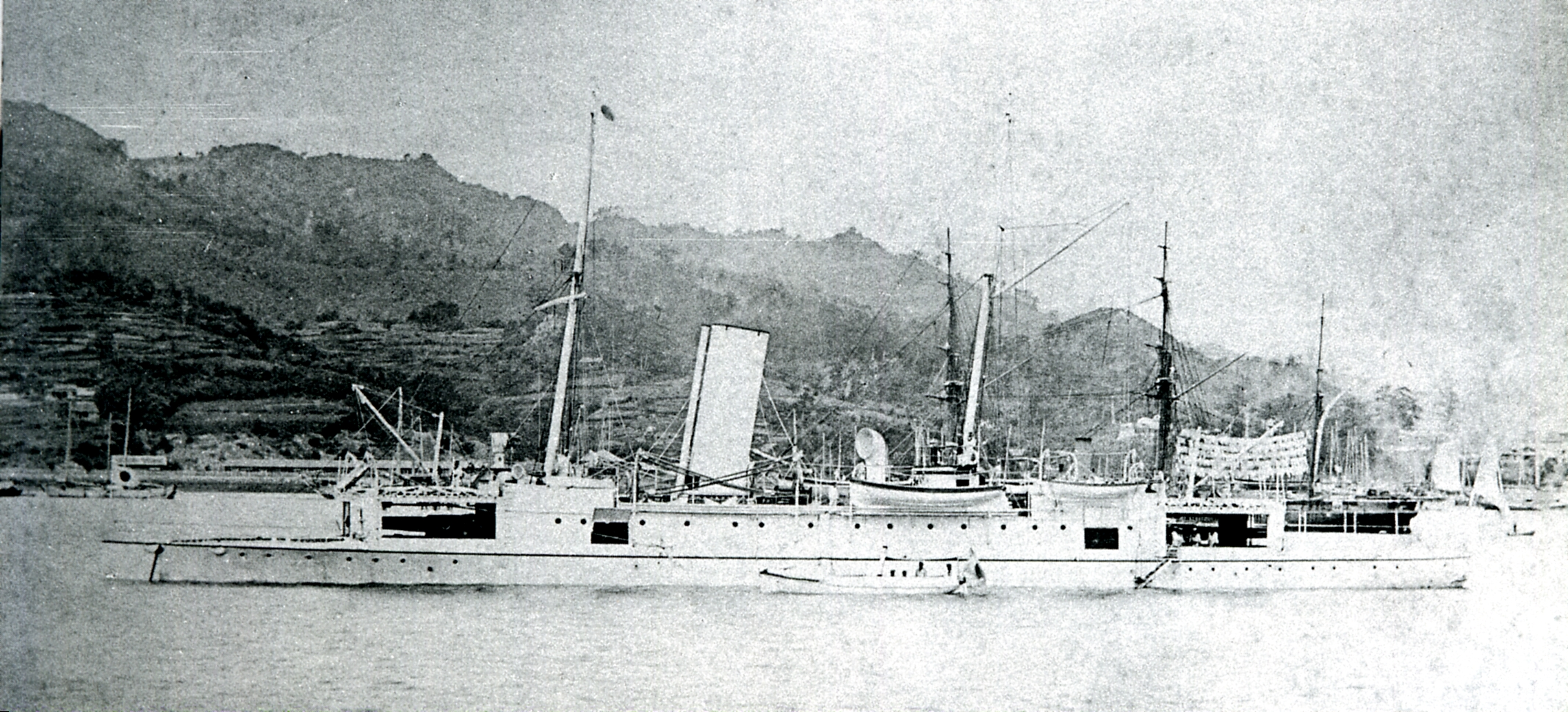
- Japanese cruiser Tsukushi

History

Chile
- Name: Arturo Prat
- Builder: Armstrong
- Laid down: 10 February 1879
- Launched: 11 August 1880
- Fate: Purchase cancelled, incomplete hull sold to Japan

Empire of Japan
- Name: Tsukushi
- Ordered: 1883 Fiscal Year
- Commissioned: 18 June 1883
- Stricken: 26 May 1906
- Fate: Scrapped 1910

General characteristics
- Class & type: Tsukushi-class cruiser
- Displacement: 1,350 long tons (1,370 t)
- Length: 64 m (210 ft)
- Beam: 9.7 m (31 ft 10 in)
- Draught: 4.4 m (14 ft 5 in)
- Propulsion: reciprocating steam engine; 2 shaft, 4 boilers; 2,887 shp
- Speed: 16.5 knots (19.0 mph; 30.6 km/h)
- Range: 300 tons coal
- Complement: 186
- Armament: 2 × 254 mm guns (fore and aft); 4 × 120 mm (4.7 in) guns (side); 2 × 9-pounder guns; 1 × Hotchkiss gun; 2 × 450 mm (18 in) torpedo tubes

Tsukushi (筑紫) was an early unprotected cruiser, serving in the fledgling Imperial Japanese Navy. Its name is a traditional name for Kyūshū island. Its sister ships Chaoyong and Yangwei were acquired by the Chinese Beiyang Fleet.

== Background ==
The design for Tsukushi was advertised by its designer British naval architect Sir George Wightwick Rendel at the Armstrong shipyards at Newcastle upon Tyne in England as an example of a low-cost cruiser able to withstand larger ironclad warships. In theory, the ship would rely on its small size and higher speed, along with a higher muzzle velocity main battery to attack larger, more cumbersome foes – very similar to the principles of Jeune Ecole, as promoted by French naval architect Émile Bertin. However, the British Admiralty was very skeptical of the idea, and had concerns over the seaworthiness of the design in the North Sea, and did not order any of the design for the Royal Navy. Armstrong turned to overseas clients instead; however, rapid technological advances in ship design and naval artillery (with the advent of large calibre quick-firing guns) rendered the design with its weak armor and small guns obsolete within a few years.

== Design ==
Tsukushi had an all-steel construction with waterproof bulkheads, a single smokestack, and twin masts, which could also be used for sails. The prow was reinforced for ramming. The power plant was a double expansion reciprocating steam engine with four cylindrical boilers driving twin screws. The ship had a number of technical innovations, including a hydraulic steering system and electrical incandescent light fixtures. The ship's main armament were two breech-loading 10-inch Armstrong cannons, one on the bow and one on the stern, mounted in stationary gun shields. The ship also had four 5.1-inch guns (two to each side), two 57-mm long guns, and one Gatling gun, as well as two torpedo tubes.

== Service record ==
Tsukushi was laid down as Arturo Prat on 10 February 1879 for the Chilean Navy and launched on 11 August 1880. However, in the middle of construction, the Chilean-Peruvian War ended, and Chile cancelled the order. The Imperial Japanese Navy picked up the contract for the semi-completed vessel. Tsukushi arrived in Japan after its shakedown cruise from England on 16 June 1883.

Tsukushi did not see combat in the First Sino-Japanese War, but was used for patrolling between Korea, Dairen and Weihaiwei in a reserve capacity in the Western Fleet. It was assigned as a flagship for gunboat squadrons used to support ground troops, and in this capacity led the gunboats Banjō, Maya, and Chōkai up the Taedong River in Korea in September 1894 to provide support for the Battle of Pyongyang. After the war, Tsukushi was designated a first-class gunboat. The ship was rearmed in 1898, with its Armstrong cannon replaced by four 120 mm (4.7 in) quick-firing guns, and its lighter weaponry replaced by one 76-mm, and two 27-mm guns, and two machine guns. During the Boxer Rebellion of 1900 Tsukushi was stationed at Amoy and Shanghai to protect Japanese civilians and interests at the Japanese concessions.

During the Russo-Japanese War, Tsukushi served as a guard ship patrolling the Tsushima Straits between Korea and Kyūshū, and as an escort vessel covering the transport of Japanese troops to the Korean Peninsula. It was present as the Battle of Tsushima. Afterwards, Tsukushi was assigned to the Kure Naval District and served as a guard ship at the Port of Kobe.

After the war, Tsukushi was used briefly as a torpedo training vessel, and was struck from the navy list on 25 May 1906. It was scrapped in 1910.
