= Bowcombe Creek =

Tidal creek in south Devon, England

Coordinates: 50.2762°N 3.7600°W

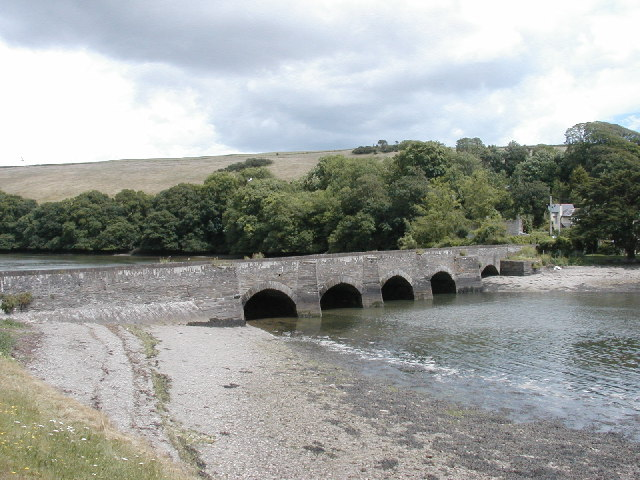
New Bridge, Bowcombe Creek

Bowcombe Creek is a tidal creek in Kingsbridge, Devon, England. It is the most northerly creek of the Kingsbridge Estuary. The creek is fed by a stream to the north and is located one mile south-east of Kingsbridge.

The A379 road crosses the southern portion of the creek over the so-called New Bridge. This bridge over the estuary was constructed by James Meadows Rendel in 1826. It was originally made of four masonry arches and an opening span, but this was eventually replaced with a fifth arch.
