= Rendell =

Rendell is a surname. Notable people with the surname include:

- Alexander Rendell (born 1990), Thai-British actor, singer and environmentalist
- Don Rendell (1926–2015), English jazz musician and arranger
- Ed Rendell (born 1944), American lawyer and politician, former Governor of Pennsylvania
- James Rendell (born 1980), English cricketer
- Joan Rendell (1921–2010), English historian, writer and phillumenist
- Kayla Rendell (born 2001), English footballer
- Marjorie Rendell (born 1947), American federal judge, former First Lady of Pennsylvania
- Martha Rendell (1871–1909), Australian murderer
- Matt Rendell (1959–2023), Australian rules footballer
- Ruth Rendell (1930–2015), British mystery writer
- Scott Rendell (born 1986), English footballer
- Stephen Rendell (1819–1893), English-Canadian merchant and politician
- Stuart Rendell (born 1972), Australian hammer thrower

== See also ==
- Rendell (given name)
- Rendel
- Rendall
- Randall (disambiguation)
- Rundle
