= Nathaniel Beardmore =

British civil engineer

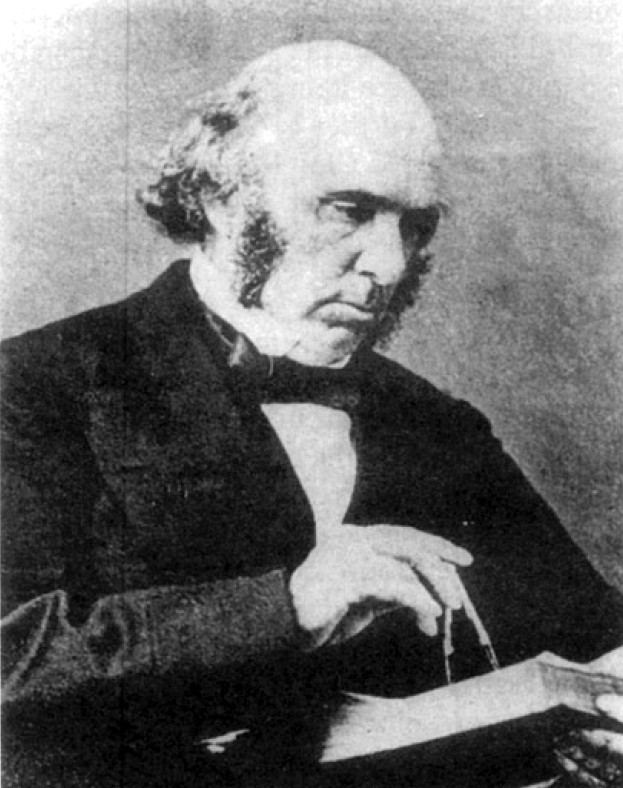
- Beardmore from a pen and ink drawing circa 1862
- Born: 19 March 1816; Nottingham, England
- Died: 24 August 1872 (aged 56); Broxbourne, Hertfordshire, England
- Occupation: Civil engineer

Nathaniel Beardmore (19 March 1816 – 24 August 1872) was a British civil engineer known for his textbook on hydraulic engineering, and his work on water projects associated with the River Lea.

== Life and career ==
Beardmore was born on 19 March 1816 in Nottingham, England. He began his professional education as a pupil to Plymouth architect George Wightwick, and subsequently apprenticed to the well-known civil engineer James Meadows Rendel (1799-1856). He later became a partner in Rendel's engineering practice, for which he prepared surveys and drawings of railways, roads, bridges and harbors, worked on water supplies in both Scotland and England, and to a lesser extent worked on railroad projects. His partnership with Rendel ceased amicably in 1848, and Beardmore in 1850 became the sole engineer for the drainage and navigation works on the River Lea. In 1854 he was awarded a Telford Medal by the Institution of Civil Engineers for his paper 'Description of the Navigation and Drainage Works, recently executed on the Tidal portion of the River Lea'.

A man of diverse talents and many interests, he was elected a Fellow of the Geological Society of London (1848), and a Fellow of the Royal Astronomical Society (1858). He was also elected a member of the Institution of Civil Engineers (1846), and a member of the Royal Meteorological Society (1851), serving in 1861 and 1862 as president of the latter society.

Beardmore moved in 1855 to Broxbourne, Hertfordshire, where he died on 24 August 1872 of pneumonia. His eldest son Nathaniel St. Bernard Beardmore inherited his business and carried on his engineering practice.

== Works ==
Beardmore published a well-known book, Hydraulic Tables, in 1850, when he began his own engineering practice. Subsequent editions of this work under the longer title of the Manual of Hydrology; containing I. Hydraulic and other Tables; II. Rivers, Flow of Water, Springs, Wells, and Percolation; III. Tides, Estuaries, and Tidal Rivers; IV. Rain-fall and Evaporation became the standard professional text-book for hydraulic engineering. A third, expanded edition of this work that appeared in 1862 enhanced his reputation as an engineer.

== Family ==
Beardmore was the second son of Joshua Beardmore and his wife Dorothea Cox. He was raised in a religious family, his father's maternal uncle being Archdeacon John Owen, who was Chaplain General of the British Armed Forces. He married in 1841 Mary Bernard (1816–1890), the oldest daughter of civil servant John Frederick Bernard. They had ten children, eight of whom survived their father, including the three below.

- Frances Mary Beardmore (1843–1926) married the popular poet and essayist Henry Austin Dobson (1840–1921).
- Nathaniel St. Bernard Beardmore (1848–1885) followed his father as a civil engineer and was his assistant on various projects, including some associated with the River Lea. He was elected a Fellow of the Royal Geographical Society, and of the Royal Meteorological Society, as well as a Member of the Geologists' Association.
- Rev. Henry Leslie Beardmore, M.A. (1855–1933) was Rector of Ripple, Kent, and later Rector of St. Peter's Church, Mawdesley with Bispham, Lancashire.
