= George Wightwick Rendel =

British naval architect (1833-1902)

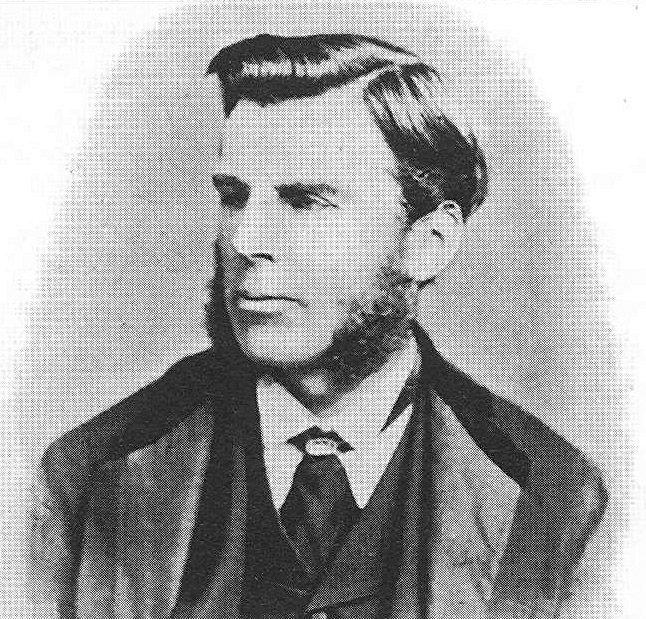
- Born: 6 February 1833; Plymouth, England
- Died: 9 October 1902 (aged 69); Sandown, Isle of Wight, England
- Resting place: St. Mary's Roman Catholic Cemetery, Kensal Green, London
- Education: Harrow School
- Occupation(s): Naval architect and engineer
- Spouse(s): Harriet Simpson (m. 1860; died 1878) Lucinia Pinelli (m. 1880)
- Children: 5 & 4
- Parents: James Meadows Rendel (father); Catherine Harris (mother)
- Relatives: George William Rendel (son); Stuart Rendel (brother); Alexander Rendel (brother); Hamilton Rendel (brother); Harry Stuart Goodhart-Rendel (nephew); James Murray Dobson (cousin)

George Wightwick Rendel (6 February 1833 – 9 October 1902) was an English engineer, and naval architect. He was closely associated with the Tyneside industrialist and armaments manufacturer, William George Armstrong.

== Family ==
George was the third (of five) sons of the civil engineer James Meadows Rendel and his wife Catherine Harris. He was named after George Wightwick, a lifelong friend of his father. He was educated at Harrow, but ran away in 1849. His siblings included Alexander Meadows Rendel, Hamilton Owen Rendel and the Liberal MP Stuart Rendel, 1st Baron Rendel.

George Rendel married firstly on 13 December 1860 Harriet Simpson, daughter of Joseph Simpson, the British vice-consul at Kronstadt. They had five sons before her death in 1878. He met his second wife, Lucinia Pinelli, in Rome, while serving on a design committee of the Italian Ministry of Marine. They married in 1880 and had three sons (Silvio Rendel, Florian Rendel and George Rendel) and a daughter. His youngest son went on to become the distinguished diplomat Sir George William Rendel.

== Engineering career ==
=== Engineering apprenticeship ===
Working for his father, at first on the Great Grimsby Royal docks, then in company with his elder brother Lewis Rendel on the eastern breakwater and new Admiralty pier at Holyhead, he was well prepared for an apprenticeship to his father's great friend, Sir William Armstrong, at his Elswick works. He lived with Armstrong at his house in Jesmond for three years before completing his engineering education at his father's London office. His father died in 1856 and the brothers George, Stuart and Hamilton all joined Armstrong's company, while Alexander took over the family business.

=== Elswick Ordnance Company ===
In 1859 Sir William Armstrong formed the Elswick Ordnance Company in order to supply guns for the British Army. Armstrong had been appointed as Engineer of Rifled Ordnance to the War Department, and to avoid a conflict of interests, he had no financial interest in the new company. George Rendel was one of three partners in the business, along with George Cruddas and Richard Lambert. Armstrong had been helped in his early career by James Rendel, and treated his son as a protégé. In 1864 the Elswick Ordnance Company was merged with Armstrong's original company to form Sir W G Armstrong and Company. George Rendel was one of seven partners in the new company, and was in joint charge of the ordnance departments, together with Captain Andrew Noble.

=== Rendel gunboats ===
In 1867 Armstrong signed an agreement with a local shipbuilder, Dr. Charles Mitchell, whereby Mitchell's shipyard would build warships and Armstrong's company would provide the armaments. George Rendel was put in charge of the new venture and he designed the early ships produced by it. These were the Rendel gunboats (or "flat-iron gunboats" after their physical similarity to a contemporary flat iron) produced for the British Admiralty as well as for Italy, Brazil and Chile. The first of these was HMS Staunch, delivered in 1868.

=== Unarmoured cruisers ===
Armstrong's Elswick yard became well known for its construction of cruisers, and Rendel designed many of these. He designed a series of 1,350 ton unarmoured 16 knot cruisers for the Chinese (Chaoyong and Yangwei) and Chilean navies.

=== Protected cruisers ===
Following this, together with Armstrong, he designed the world's first protected cruiser, the prototype being the Esmeralda. The design had an arched steel protective deck running from stem to stern just below the waterline. All of the vital parts of the ship were placed below the protective deck. The ship also had cork-filled cellular compartments to aid with buoyancy. The Esmeralda was built for Chile, and was later sold to Japan and became the Izumi. The Japanese navy in particular took several Rendel-designed cruisers, with which they defeated the Russian navy at the Battle of Tsushima in 1905.

=== Forced draught ===
Rendel and Alfred Yarrow pioneered the use of forced-draught fans in boiler rooms, significantly increasing the power of marine steam engines at minimal cost in weight or volume.

=== Naval guns ===
Rendel worked on the design of large naval guns, using hydraulics to reduce the number of men required to work the guns and the space required. This was first tried on HMS Thunderer, which was able to have 38-ton guns fitted, instead of the 35-ton guns originally planned. His hydraulic systems were subsequently used in all Royal Navy ships as well as the ships of several foreign navies.

=== HMS Inflexible ===
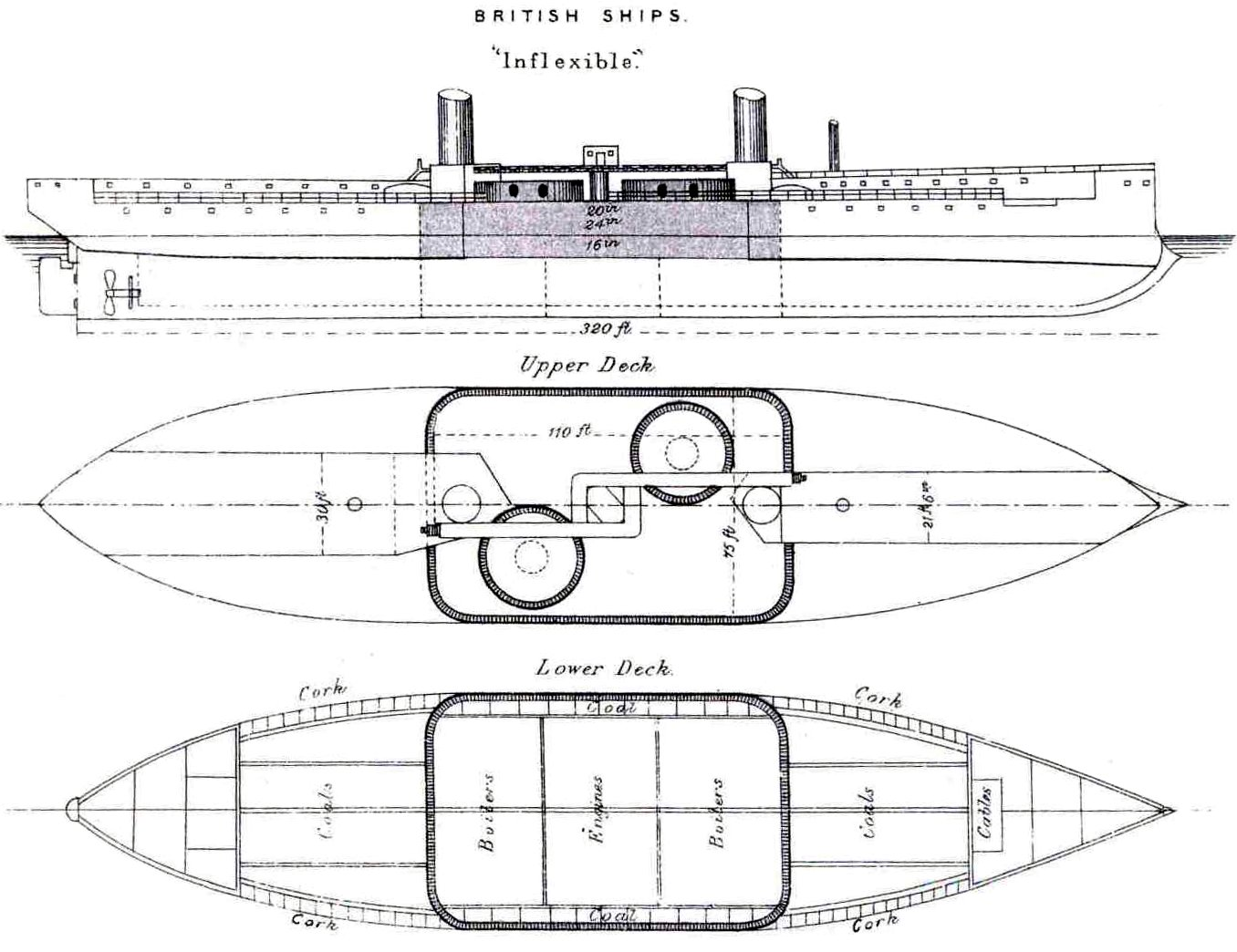
Plans of HMS Inflexible

In 1871 Rendel was appointed a member of the British government committee on warship design. He played a major role in the 1877 design of the innovative 11,880-long-ton (12,070 t) HMS Inflexible, which was notable for being the first major warship to depend in part for the protection of her buoyancy by a horizontal armoured deck below the water-line rather than armoured sides along the waterline. She was packed with other new features: her guns weighed 80 tons each; she carried the thickest armour ever to have been carried by a British warship, at 24 inches (61 cm); great attention was paid to her damaged stability to ensure she could absorb damage and remain upright and buoyant.

=== Resignation ===
Rendel resigned from Armstrong's company in 1882, when Armstrong decided to make Andrew Noble sole manager of the Ordnance Department. In fact, Rendel loathed Noble, as did his brothers, who also worked for Armstrong.

=== Admiralty career ===
He was invited by the First Lord of the Admiralty, the Earl of Northbrook to become an extra-professional Additional Civil Lord of the Admiralty on the Board of Admiralty in 1882, but retired from this post due to ill-health in 1885.

=== Italy ===
He was persuaded to rejoin Armstrongs in 1888, in order to manage a new armaments factory, built as a subsidiary, at Pozzuoli, near Naples in Italy. In 1900 Armstrong died, and Sir Andrew Noble succeeded him as chairman of the company, now known as Sir W G Armstrong, Whitworth & Co Ltd. After Armstrong's death, the old acrimony between the Rendels and Andrew Noble came to the fore, with George and his brothers criticising Noble's management of the company. The dispute between the two sides was not resolved until several years after George's death.

== Honours and awards ==
In 1863 he was elected a member of the Institution of Civil Engineers and the following year his paper "Gun carriages and mechanical appliances for working of heavy ordnance" was awarded the Watt medal. He was awarded the Spanish Order of Charles III in 1871, and the order of the Cross of Italy in 1876. He was elected as a member of the Institution of Naval Architects in 1879, and became vice-president in 1882.

== Death ==
Rendel retired to "Broadlands", his home in Sandown, Isle of Wight. He used a wheelchair for the last two years of his life. He died at home on 9 October 1902 and, although not a Roman Catholic, was at his own request buried at the St. Mary's Roman Catholic Cemetery at Kensal Green in London.
