= Alexander Meadows Rendel =

English engineer (1829-1918)

Sir Alexander Meadows Rendel
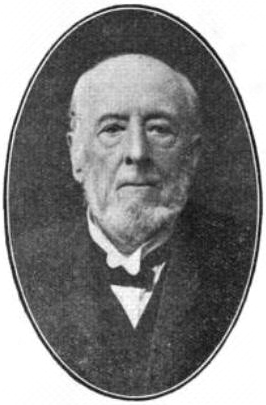
- Born: 3 April 1829; Plymouth, England
- Died: 23 January 1918 (aged 89); London, England
- Resting place: Brookwood Cemetery; 51°17′47″N 0°37′26″W
- Education: The King's School Canterbury; Trinity College, Cambridge
- Spouse: Dame Eliza Rendel (m. 1853; died 1916)
- Parents: James Meadows Rendel (father); Catherine Jane Harris (mother)
- Relatives: Stuart Rendel (brother); George Wightwick Rendel (brother); Hamilton Rendel (brother); Harry Stuart Goodhart-Rendel (nephew); James Murray Dobson (cousin); Capt. William Hobson RN (father-in-law); Halsey Ricardo (son-in-law); Harry Ricardo (grandson); Sandy Rendel (grandson); David Rendel (great grandson)
- Engineering career
- Discipline: civil engineer

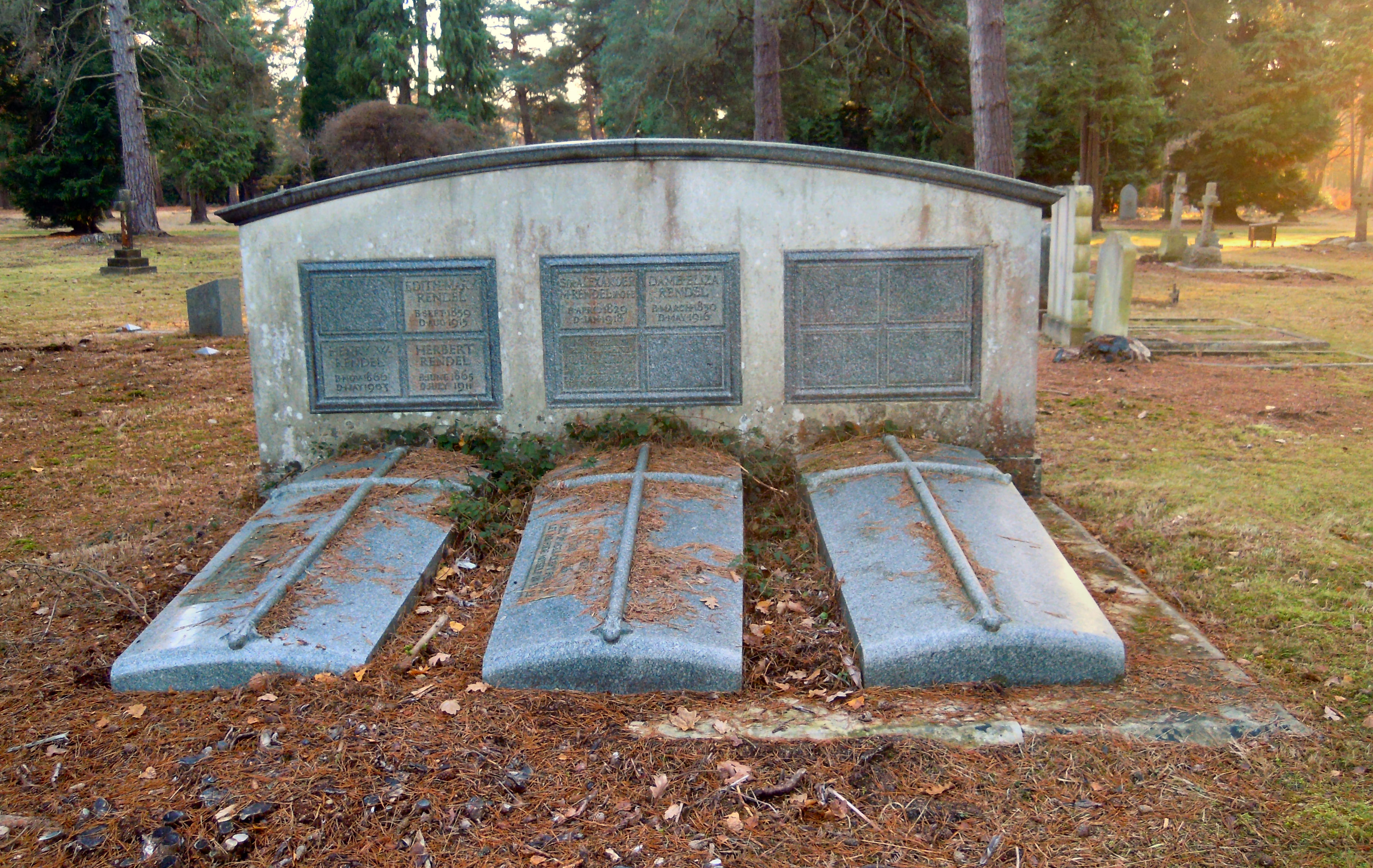
The grave of Alexander Meadows Rendel in Brookwood Cemetery

Sir Alexander Meadows Rendel, KCIE (3 April 1829 – 23 January 1918) was an English civil engineer.

== Early life ==
Rendel was born in Plymouth, the eldest son of the engineer James Meadows Rendel and his wife Catherine Harris. Three of his brothers were civil engineers: George Wightwick Rendel, Stuart Rendel, 1st Baron Rendel (who was also a Liberal MP), and Hamilton Owen Rendel (who designed and supervised the installation of the steam driven compound condensing pump engines, hydraulic accumulators and hydraulic machinery that first operated the bascules of the iconic Tower Bridge in London).

He was educated at The King's School Canterbury and Trinity College, Cambridge.

== Career ==
Rendel was appointed as engineer to the London Dock Company in 1856, and was responsible for the enlargement of the Shadwell Basin and the construction of the Royal Albert Dock including the Connaught tunnel to divert the railway. He was also responsible for the Albert and Edinburgh Docks in Leith, and the Workington Dock and Harbour in Cumbria. In 1857-1858 he visited India, and was consulting engineer to the India Office, the East India Railway and other Indian railways, and was a member of the commission to determine narrow gauge for Indian Railways, in 1870.

He designed the Lansdowne Bridge Rohri at Sukkur over the Indus River, which was made and constructed in London then shipped out and when it was completed in 1889 was the largest cantilever bridge in the world. The climax of his bridge-building career was considered to be the Howrah or Jubilee Bridge allowing trains to cross the Hooghly River near Calcutta; this was opened by the Viceroy on 21 February 1887. He was appointed a Knight Commander of the Order of the Indian Empire (KCIE) in 1897.

He was the designer of Hardinge Bridge in Bangladesh.

== Personal life ==
Rendel married Eliza Hobson (1830–1916), daughter of Captain William Hobson RN, the late first Governor of New Zealand. The ceremony was held on 27 January 1853 at the Parish Church of Stoke Damerel, Devonport by the Rev James Elliot, uncle of the bride. They had five sons and three daughters, including:

- Dr. Arthur B. Rendel, who married Elizabeth Cecilia Blair, daughter of Colonel H. F. Blair of the Royal Navy, in 1902.
- Catharine Jane Rendel, who married architect Halsey Ricardo.

Rendel had a 400 acre estate Rikketswood in Charlwood purchased before his brother Stuart bought the upstaging Hatchlands.

Rendel died at 51 Gordon Square, London, on 23 January 1918. He is buried with his family in Brookwood Cemetery.
