= Hamilton Owen Rendel =

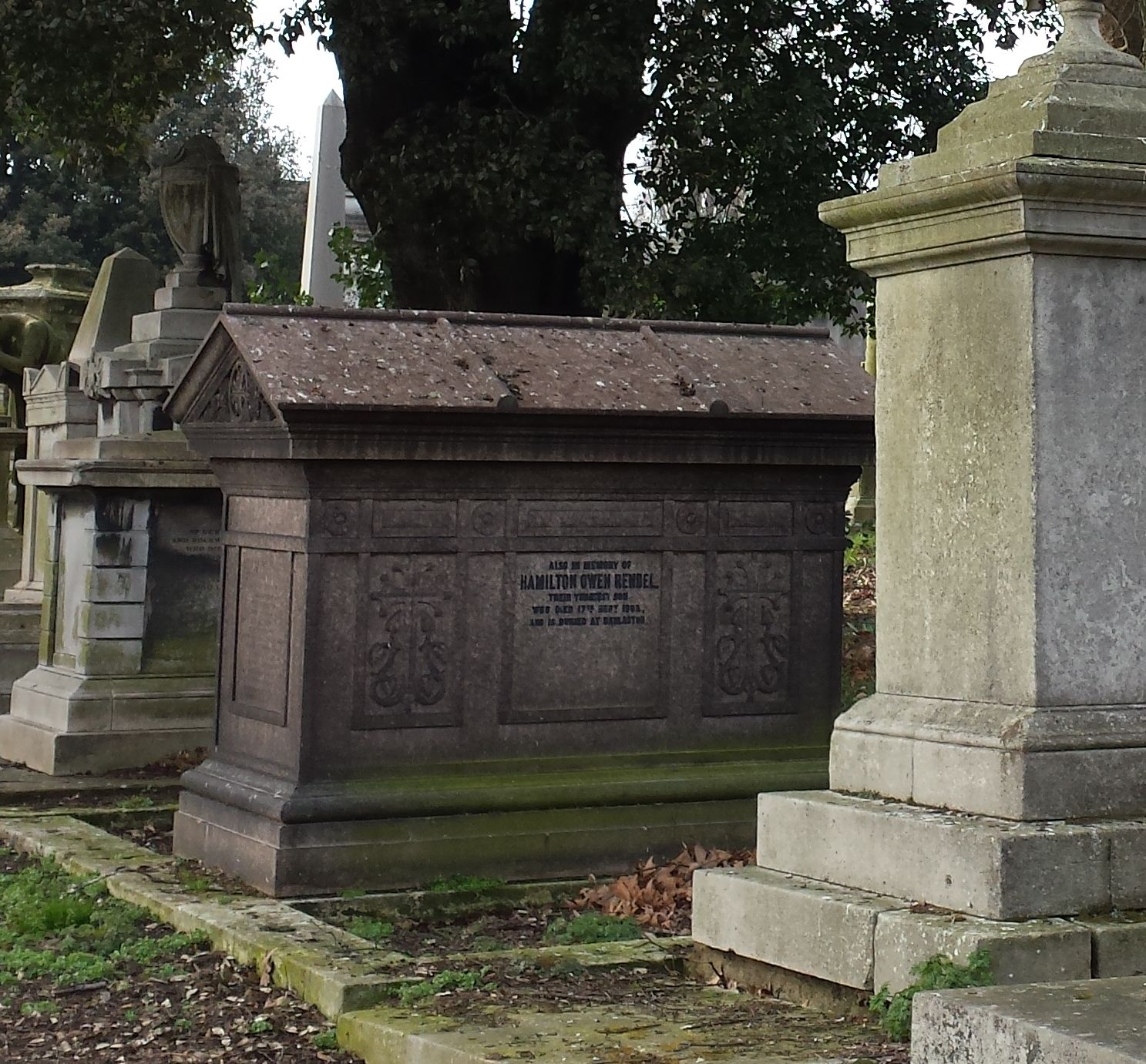
Grave of Hamilton Owen Rendel at Kensal Green Cemetery

Hamilton Owen Rendel (1843–17 September 1902) designed and installed the original raising mechanism of the Tower Bridge while working for Sir W. G. Armstrong Mitchell & Company of Newcastle upon Tyne. It was subsequently operated by the London Hydraulic Power Company.

== Family ==
Rendel was a member of a notable family of engineers. His father, James Meadows Rendel, was a civil engineer who married his mother, Catherine Jane Harris. His siblings were:

- Sir Alexander Meadows Rendel (1829–1918) – civil engineer
- George Wightwick Rendel (1833–1902) – naval architect and civil engineer
- Emily Frances Rendel (1836–1897) married Charles Bowen, 1st Baron Bowen in 1862.
- Emily Catherine Rendel (1840–1921) married Clement Francis Wedgwood in 1866
- Stuart Rendel, 1st Baron Rendel

A cousin, James Murray Dobson, became resident engineer of the Buenos Aires harbour works in the 1880s and 1890s.

== Career ==
Rendel took his degree at Cambridge University, and immediately after leaving started at the Armstrong, Mitchell and Company at Elswick, Tyne and Wear, where he later became head of the engineering department.

His brother Stuart was managing Armstrong Mitchell's London office and Hamilton was given the role of managing the project to build the hydraulic equipment operating Tower Bridge.

He retired in early 1902 due to ill health, and died later the same year on 17 September 1902 as he was visiting his sister Mrs. Wedgwood at her residence The Lea, in Barlaston, Staffordshire. He was buried at Kensal Green Cemetery in London.

== Tower Bridge hydraulics ==
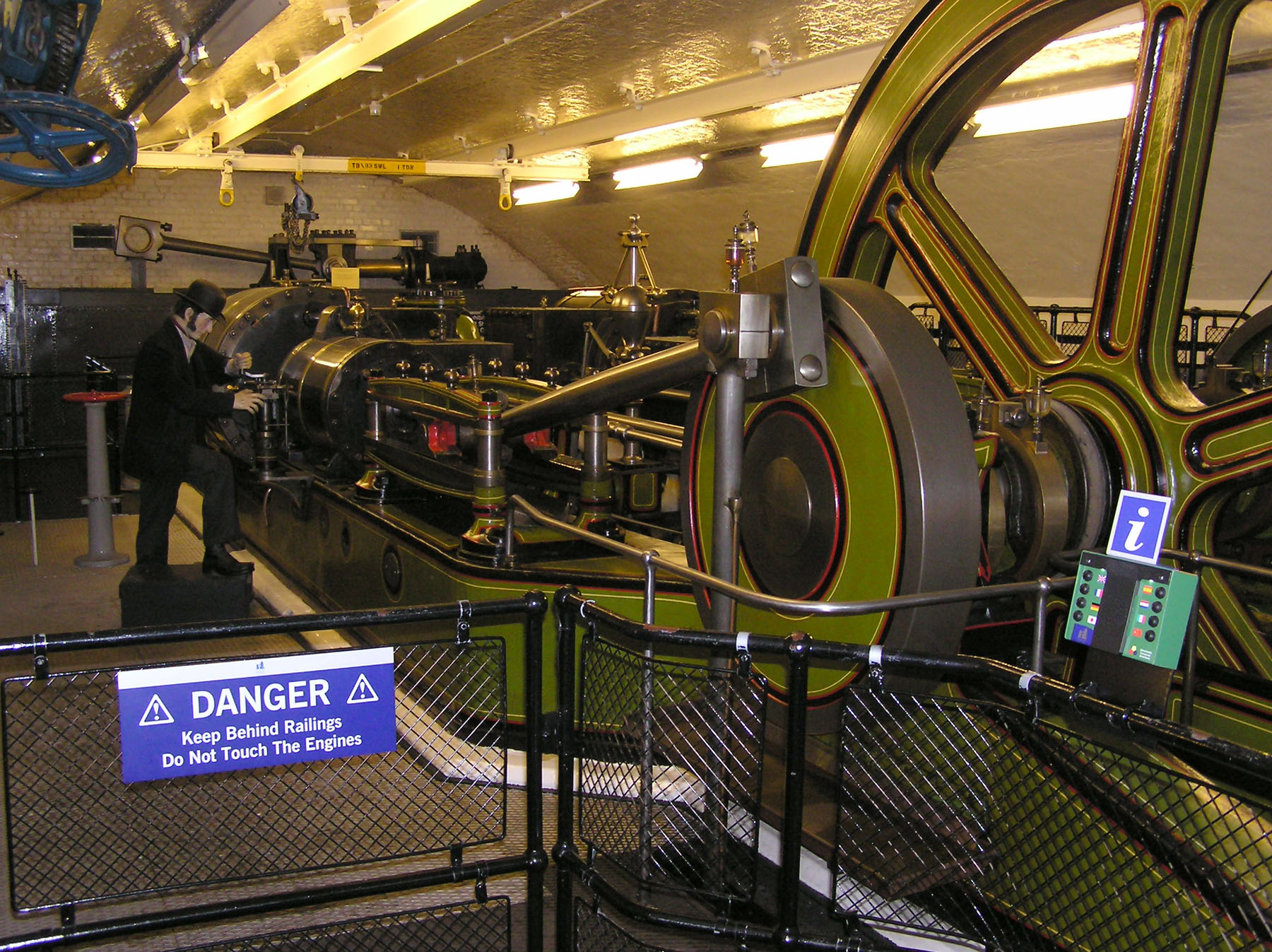
One of the original steam engines: a 360 hp horizontal twin-tandem compound engine, fitted with Meyer expansion slide valves

The mechanism was powered by pressurised water stored in several hydraulic accumulators. Water, at a pressure of 750 psi (5.2 MPa), was pumped into the accumulators by two 360 hp (270 kW) stationary steam engines, each driving a force pump from its piston tail rod. The accumulators each comprise a 20 inches (51 cm) ram on which sits a very heavy weight to maintain the desired pressure.
