= James Meadows Rendel (engineer) =

British civil engineer

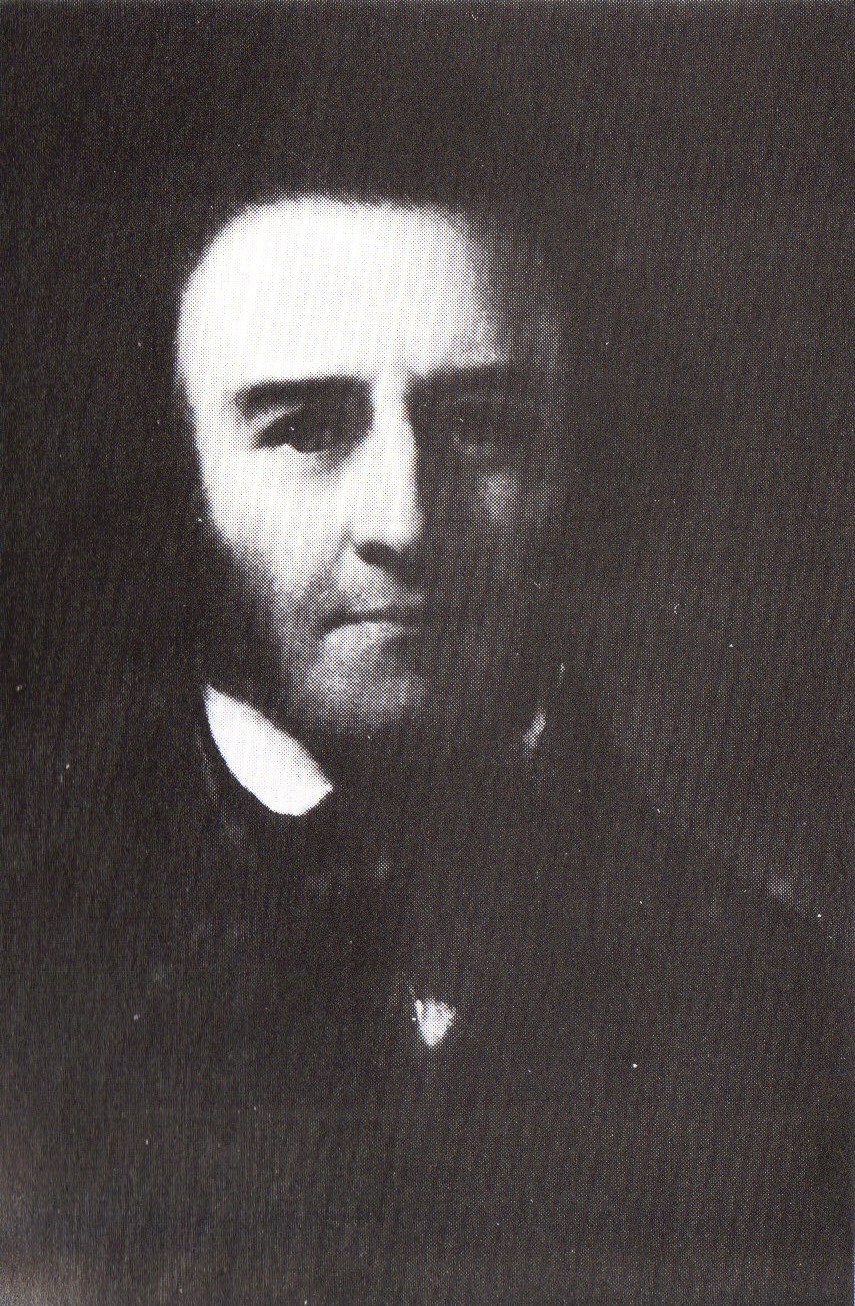
- Rendel painted by Sir William Boxall
- Born: December 1799; Okehampton, Devon, England
- Died: 21 November 1856 (aged 56); Kensington Palace Gardens, London, England
- Engineering career
- Discipline: civil engineer
- Institutions: Institution of Civil Engineers (president) Fellow of the Royal Society

James Meadows Rendel FRS (December 1799 – 21 November 1856) was an English civil engineer.

== Early life and career ==
Rendel was the son of the surveyor James Rendel or Rendle and his wife Jane, daughter of the architect John Meadows (died 1791); he was born near Okehampton, Devon, in 1799. He was initiated into the operations of a millwright under an uncle at Teignmouth, while from his father he learned some civil engineering. At an early age he went to London as a surveyor under Thomas Telford, by whom he was employed on the surveys for the proposed suspension bridge across the Mersey at Runcorn. About 1822 he settled at Plymouth, and commenced the construction of roads in the north of Devon. One of his smaller projects, still surviving, was an 1826 bridge over Bowcombe Creek on the Kingsbridge Estuary.

In August 1824 he was employed by the Earl of Morley to make a bridge across the Catwater, an estuary of the Plym within the harbour of Plymouth at Laira. To guard against the undermining effects of the current, he formed an artificial bottom. The bridge, which cost £27,126, was opened on 14 July 1827. With the exception of John Rennie's 1819 Southwark Bridge over the Thames, it was the largest iron structure then existing, and in 1836 Rendel received a Telford Medal from the Institution of Civil Engineers for a paper describing its construction.

== Plymouth partnership ==
He soon entered into a partnership at Plymouth with Nathaniel Beardmore, and his practice rapidly grew. In 1826 he erected Bowcombe Bridge, near Kingsbridge, Devon, when hydraulic power was first applied to the machinery for making swing bridges. In 1831 he introduced a new system of crossing rivers by means of chain ferries worked by steam, and in 1832 he constructed a floating bridge on this principle, crossing the Dart at Dartmouth. Between 1832 and 1834 similar floating bridges were erected at Torpoint and Saltash across the Tamar, which greatly facilitated the intercourse between Devon and Cornwall. For these achievements a second Telford medal was awarded to Rendel in 1838. The Torpoint Ferry still operates, albeit much updated. A similar floating bridge was implemented as the Woolston ferry between Woolston, Hampshire and Southampton in 1836.

During this period Rendel was also engaged in reporting on harbours and rivers in the southwest of England, and thus acquired that mastery of hydraulic engineering on which his fame chiefly rests. In 1829 he designed the harbour which was afterwards executed at Par Docks in Cornwall; in 1835 he carried out works on the Bude harbour, dock, and Bude Canal, and in 1836 he designed Brixham harbour and the breakwater at Torquay. In 1836–37 he designed, as a terminus to the Great Western Railway, the Millbay Docks, Plymouth, afterwards executed by Isambard Kingdom Brunel. In 1843–44 he constructed canals in Devon, and was engaged in the Colchester and Arundel navigation; and in 1844 he designed harbour improvements for Newhaven and Littlehampton in Sussex. At the same time he was largely employed on marine works by the Admiralty and other government departments, as well as by public companies. The Exchequer Loan Commissioners engaged him in 1835–37 in the repair of the Montrose suspension bridge after its fall. There he introduced the principle of trussing the framing of the roadway. This system of preventing the undulation, by which so many structures of this kind have been destroyed, was quickly acknowledged to be essential to their safety.

== London practice ==
About 1838 Rendel dissolved his partnership with Beardmore at Plymouth, and settled in London, but still was chiefly employed on work for his native county. In 1841 he constructed the Millbay Pier, Plymouth – a work of considerable difficulty owing to the depth of water in which it was built. Here he first introduced the method of construction since employed in Holyhead and Portland harbours.

In 1839 he was engaged in preparing schemes for a railway between Exeter and Plymouth, running over Dartmoor. At the time sufficient funds could not be raised, but an alternative coastal line was afterwards carried out by I. K. Brunel. In 1843 he made plans for docks at Birkenhead, which he defended before parliamentary committees against hostile local influence. The contest was long protracted, and the incessant labour served to shorten Rendel's life; his published evidence forms a valuable record of engineering practice of the period. In 1844–53 he constructed docks at Grimsby; in 1848–53 extensions of the docks at Leith; in 1850–53 docks at Garston on the Mersey, with extensions of the East and West India and the London docks. As constructor of the Grimsby docks he was one of the first to apply W. G. Armstrong's system of hydraulic machinery for working the lock gates, sluices, cranes, etc. For this work he received a grand medal of honour at the Paris Exhibition of 1855.

For the Admiralty he planned in 1845, and afterwards constructed, the packet and refuge harbour at Holyhead, and in 1847 he constructed the harbour of refuge at Portland. In the making of these great harbours he contrived, by means of elevated timber staging, to let down masses of stone vertically from railway trucks, and, by building up the masonry with unexampled rapidity to a point above sea level, contrived to reduce to comparative insignificance the force of the sea during building operations. As many as 24,000 tons (24 kt) of stone were deposited in one week. In 1850 he commenced making a new harbour at St. Peter Port, Guernsey.

== River improvements ==
Rendel was much occupied in the improvement of rivers. In 1852, in conjunction with Sir William Cubitt and Richard John Griffith, he examined and reported to the treasury upon the arterial drainage works in Ireland, and in 1855 he completed the suspension bridge across the Ness at Inverness for the Commissioners of Highland Roads and Bridges. His aid was also sought by foreign countries. In 1852–53 he designed docks for Genoa; in 1853–55 he reported on the harbour of Rio de Janeiro; in 1854 he reported to the Prussian government on a naval establishment at Heppens on the river Jade; and in 1854–55, by direction of the Hamburg senate, he inspected the Elbe from Hamburg to Cuxhaven. For the Spanish, he devised a system of railways between Madrid and Oviedo, as well as improvements to the river Ebro.

In England his railway work was somewhat restricted, but he executed the Birkenhead, Lancashire and Cheshire Junction Railway and in India he directed the construction of the East Indian and the Madras railways. In 1856 he reported on the new Westminster Bridge. His last work was a design for the suspension bridge across the ornamental water in St. James's Park, London.

In 1852 and 1853 Rendel served as president of the Institution of Civil Engineers, which he joined in 1824. He became a fellow of the Royal Society on 23 February 1843 and was elected a member of the council. He died at 10 Kensington Palace Gardens, London, on 21 November 1856 and is buried in Kensal Green Cemetery.

== Legacy ==
Rendel contributed to the construction of the harbours at Holyhead and Portland works. Rendel also contributed several valuable papers to the Proceedings of the Institution of Civil Engineers. He married Catherine Jane Harris, who died on 18 July 1884, aged 87. His third son, Stuart Rendel, at one time managing partner in London of Sir William Armstrong's engineering firm, was MP for Montgomeryshire from 1880 to 1894, and was raised to the peerage as Lord Rendel in 1895. Other children include:

- Sir Alexander Meadows Rendel (1829–1918) – civil engineer
- George Wightwick Rendel (1833–1902) – civil engineer
- Emily Frances Rendel (1836–1897) married Charles Bowen, 1st Baron Bowen in 1862.
- Emily Catherine Rendel (1840–1921) married Clement Francis Wedgwood in 1866
- Hamilton Owen Rendel (1843–1902)

A nephew, James Murray Dobson, became resident engineer of the Buenos Aires harbour works in the 1880s and 1890s.

In 1913, James Meadows Rendel's eldest son Alexander Meadows Rendel formed a partnership with Frederick Palmer and Seymour Briscoe Tritton, called Rendel Palmer & Tritton. In 1985, the firm was incorporated as Rendels Ltd; it trades today as Rendel Ltd.

Professional and academic associations
Preceded by William Cubitt	President of the Institution of Civil Engineers; December 1851 – December 1853	Succeeded by James Simpson
