= Henry Austin Dobson =

19th/20th-century English poet and essayist

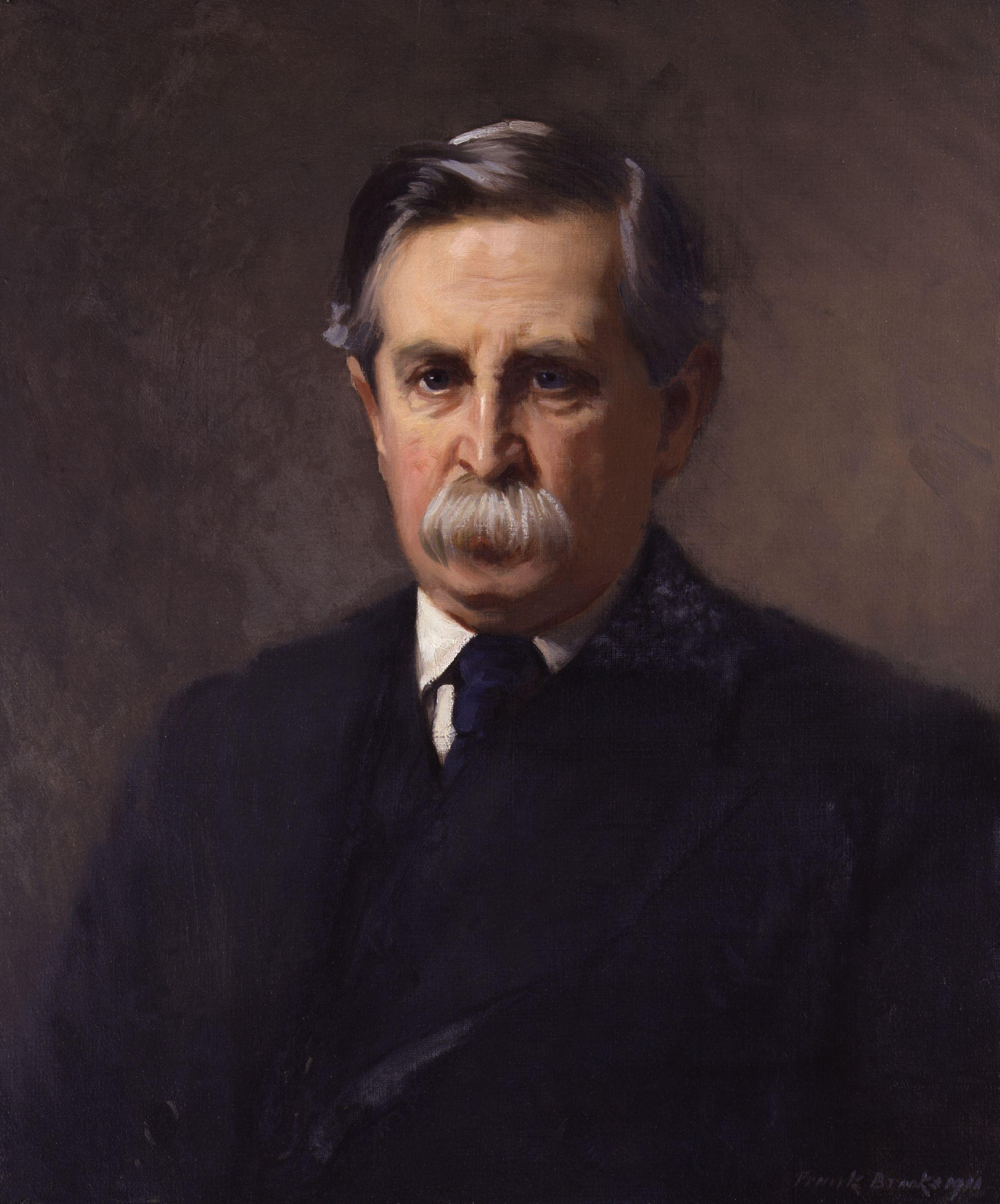
1911 portrait of Dobson by Frank Brooks

Henry Austin Dobson (18 January 1840 – 2 September 1921), usually known as Austin Dobson, was an English poet, biographer and essayist.

== Life ==
He was born at Plymouth, the eldest son of George Clarisse Dobson, a civil engineer, of French descent. When he was about eight, the family moved to Holyhead, and his first school was at Beaumaris in Anglesey. He was later educated at Coventry, and the Gymnase, Strasbourg. He returned at the age of sixteen with the intention of becoming a civil engineer. (His younger brother James would in fact become a noted engineer, helping complete the Buenos Aires harbour works in the 1880s and 1890s.) At the beginning of his career, he continued to study at the South Kensington School of Art, in his spare time, but without definite ambition. In December 1856 he entered the Board of Trade, gradually rising to the rank of principal in the harbour department, from which he retired in the autumn of 1901. In 1868, he married Frances Mary, daughter of the distinguished civil engineer Nathaniel Beardmore (1816–1872) of Broxbourne, Hertfordshire, and settled at Ealing. Dobson died in 1921 and his funeral was held on 6 September at St Peter's Church, Ealing. He is buried in the Westminster Cemetery Uxbridge Road, Hanwell, Middlesex.

== Works ==
His official career was uneventful, but as a poet and biographer he was distinguished. Those who study his work are struck by its maturity. It was about 1864 that he turned his attention to writing original prose and verse, and some of his earliest works were his best. It was not until 1868 that the appearance of St Paul's, a magazine edited by Anthony Trollope, gave Harry Dobson an opportunity and an audience; and during the next six years he contributed some of his favourite poems, including "Tu Quoque," "A Gentleman of the Old School," "A Dialogue from Plato," and "Une Marquise." Many of his poems in their original form were illustrated—some, indeed, were written to support illustrations. Composer Mary Augusta Wakefield set at least one of his poems to music.

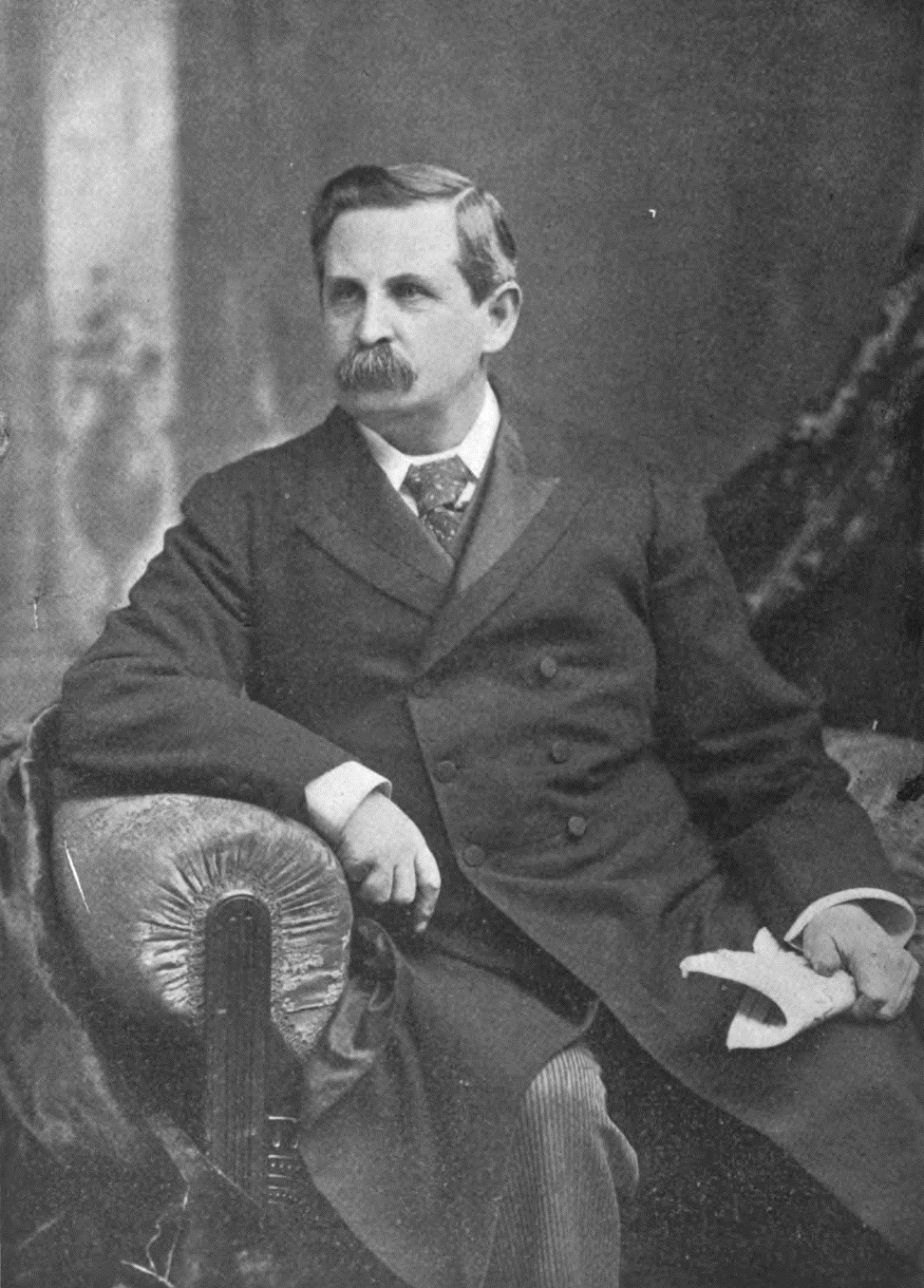
Austin Dobson

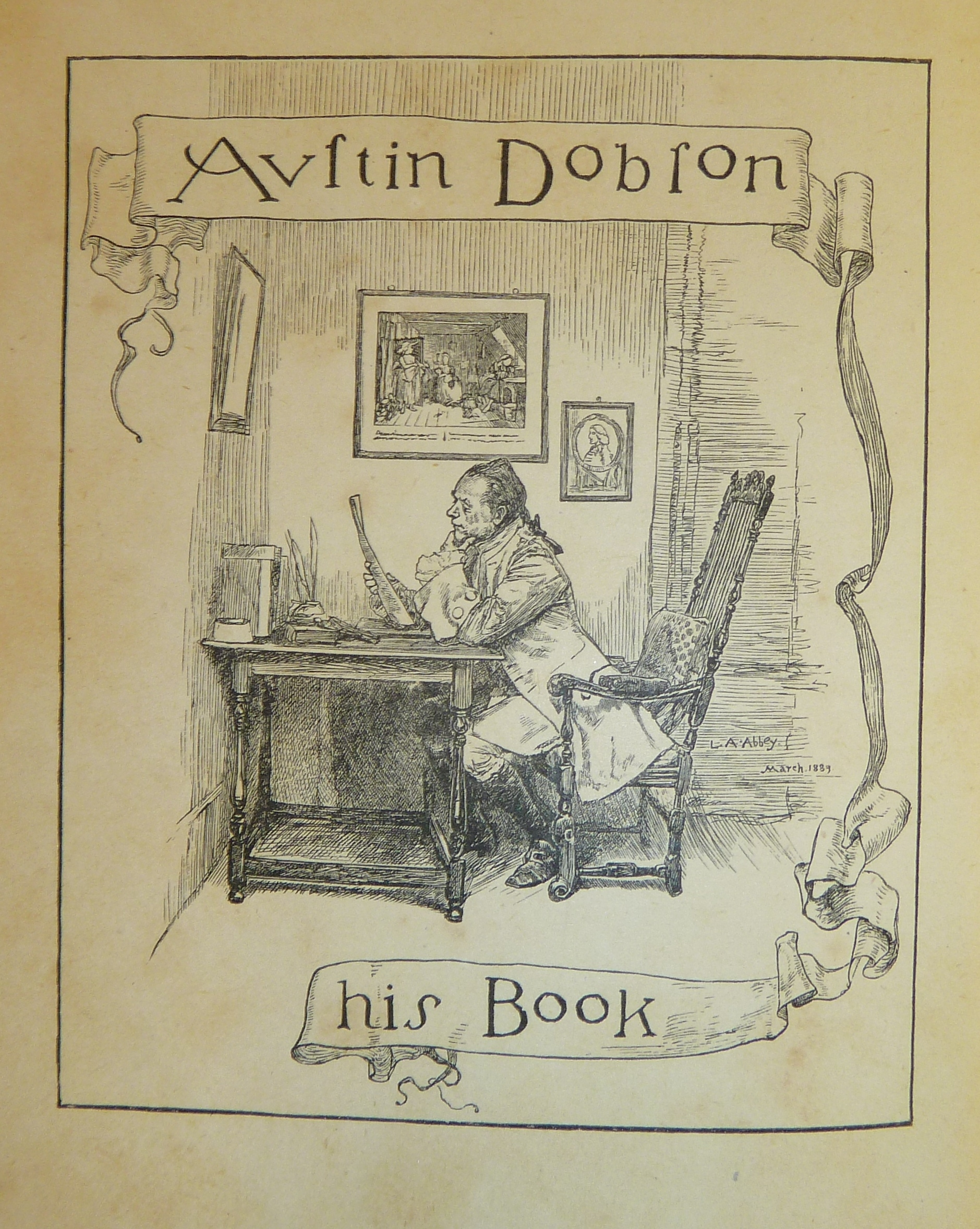
His bookplate

By the autumn of 1873 Dobson had produced enough verse for a volume, and published Vignettes in Rhyme, which quickly went through three editions. During the period of their appearance in the magazine the poems had received unusual attention, George Eliot, among others, encouraging the anonymous author. The little book immediately introduced him to a larger public. The period was an interesting one for a first appearance, since the air was full of metrical experiment. Swinburne's bold excursions into classical metre had broken new ground; it was hopeless to attempt to compete, and the poets of the day were looking for fresh forms and variations. Early in 1876, a small body of English poets discovered the French forms of Théodore de Banville, Clément Marot and François Villon, and determined to introduce them into English verse.

Dobson, who had already made successful use of the triolet, was at the head of this movement, and in May 1876 he published in The Prodigals the first original ballade written in English. This he followed by English versions of the rondel, rondeau and villanelle. An article in The Cornhill Magazine by Edmund Gosse, "A Plea for Certain Exotic Forms of Verse", appearing in July 1877, simultaneously with Dobson's second volume, Proverbs in Porcelain, drew the general eye to the possibilities and achievements of the movement. The experiment was deemed a success. In 1883 Dobson published Old-World Idylls, which contained some of his most characteristic work. By this time his taste was gradually settling on the period with which it has since become almost exclusively associated; and the spirit of the 18th century was revived in "The Ballad of Beau Brocade" and in "The Story of Rosina", as nowhere else in modern English poetry. In "Beau Brocade", the pictorial quality of his work is at its very best. He has been compared with Randolph Caldecott, with which it has much in common; but Dobson's humour was not so "rollicking" and his portraiture not so broad as that of the illustrator of John Gilpin. His appeal was more intellectual.

At the Sign of the Lyre (1885) was the next of Dobson's separate volumes of verse, and he also published a volume of Collected Poems (1897). At the Sign of the Lyre contains much variety. The admirably fresh and breezy "Ladies of St James's" has precisely the qualities we have traced in his other 18th-century poems; there are ballades and rondeaus, with all the earlier charm; and in "A Revolutionary Relic", as in "The Child Musician" of the Old-World Idylls, the poet reaches a depth of true pathos which he does not often attempt, but in which, when he seeks it, he never fails. Contrasting with these are the light occasional verses, influenced by Winthrop Mackworth Praed, but also quite individual. The chief novelty in At the Sign of the Lyre was the series of "Fables of Literature and Art", founded in manner upon John Gay. It is in these perhaps, more than in any other of his poems, that we see how Dobson interpenetrates the literature of fancy with the literature of judgment.

After 1885 Dobson was engaged mainly in critical and biographical prose, by which he added considerably to the general knowledge of his favourite 18th century writers. His biographies of Henry Fielding (1883), Thomas Bewick (1884), Richard Steele (1886), Oliver Goldsmith (1888), Horace Walpole (1890) and William Hogarth (1879-1891-1897-1902-1907) are studies marked alike by assiduous research, sympathetic presentation and sound criticism. In Four Frenchwomen (1890), in the three series of Eighteenth-Century Vignettes (1892-1894-1896), and in The Paladin of Philanthropy (1899), which contain unquestionably his most delicate prose work, the accurate detail of each study is relieved by a charm of expression which could only be attained by a poet. In 1901 he collected his hitherto unpublished poems in a volume entitled Carmina Votiva.

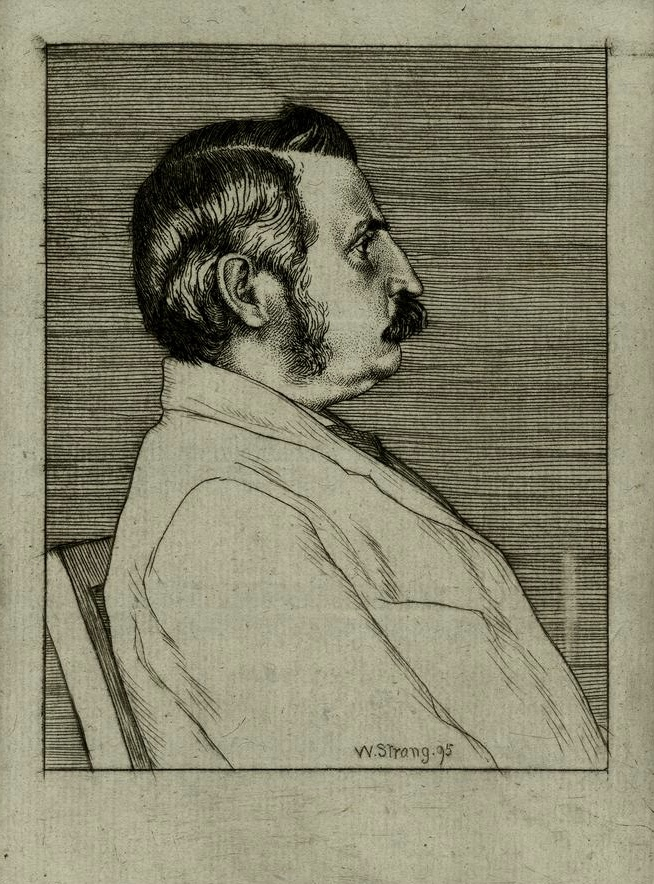
Dobson by William Strang, 1895

Dobson received an honorary doctorate (LL.D.) from the University of Edinburgh in March 1902.

In 2005 the Industrial/Nu metal band, Industrial Frost, used the words of a Dobson poem called "Before Sedan" as the lyrics of a song of the same name.

== Bibliography ==
Principal monographs and stand-alone works

- [trans.] The authentic history of Captain Castagnette: nephew of the "Man with the wooden head" (1866), London: S.O. Beeton
- [revision of] The Civil Service History of England: Being a Fact-Book of English History (1870), by Frederick Averne White
- "The drama of the doctor's window" : a brief statement concerning that poem since its appearance in "St. Paul's magazine," for February, 1870: with appendices respecting its "earlier history" (1872), London: samizdat. Only 30 copies were printed.
- Vignettes in rhyme: and Vers de société. London: H. S. King. 1873. "Henry Austin Dobson."
- [text of] Marguerite's letter: ballad (1873), London : Chappell & Co., composed by Elizabeth Philp
- [contributor to] The London Boy Problem, Some Reasons and Remedies: Homes for Working Boys in London (1876), London: s.n.
- Proverbs in porcelain, and other verses (1877), London: H. S. King
- Hogarth. London: Sampson Low, Marston. 1879.
- A Handbook of English Literature, for the use of Candidates for Examinations, Public Schools, and Students generally (1880) London: Crosby Lockwood
- Eighteenth Century Essays: selected and annotated (1882), London: Kegan Paul, Trench
- Old-world Idylls and other verses (1883), London: Kegan Paul, Trench. The preliminary leaf reads "This selection is based upon one published at New York City in 1880. With a few exceptions, the pieces are chosen from Vignettes in Rhyme, 1873, and Proverbs in Porcelain, 1877. Both volumes are out of print."
- Fielding (1883)
- Thomas Bewick and his pupils (1884), London: Chatto & Windus
- At the Sign of the Lyre. New York: Holt & Co. 1885. "Henry Austin Dobson."
- Life of Oliver Goldsmith (1888, act. [1887]), London: Walter Scott
- [compiled] Pope Commemoration 1888: Loan Museum, Catalogue of Exhibits in the Town Hall, Twickenham (1888), Richmond: Edward King. Only 100 copies were printed.
- Poems on several occasions (1889), New York: Dodd, Mead. The 1895 Edition contains corrections and additions to the text (pub. Kegan Paul, Trench, Trubner).
- Horace Walpole: a memoir with an appendix of books printed at the Strawberry Hill press (1890), London: Osgood, McIlvaine
- Four Frenchwomen (1890), London: Chatto & Windus. The work treats the lives of Charlotte Corday, Madame Roland, the Princess de Lamballe, and Madame de Genlis.
- [ed.] The Citizen of The World (1891), London: Dent, by Oliver Goldsmith
- Eighteenth Century Vignettes (1892), London: Chatto & Windus 2nd edition, 1897
- The Ballad of Beau Brocade and Other Poems of the XVIIIth Century, with fifty illustrations (1892), London: Kegan Paul, Trench, Trubner. Hugh Thomson (illus.)
- The Story of Rosina and other Verses (1895), London: Kegan Paul, Trench, Trubner. Hugh Thomson (illus.)
- A Departmental Ditty (1899), 50 copies privately printed

Posthumous collections and editions

- The Complete Poetical Works of Henry Austin Dobson (1923), A. T. A. Dobson (ed.)
