= Kingsbridge Estuary =

Estuary in Devon, England

Coordinates: 50°15′10″N 3°45′35″W

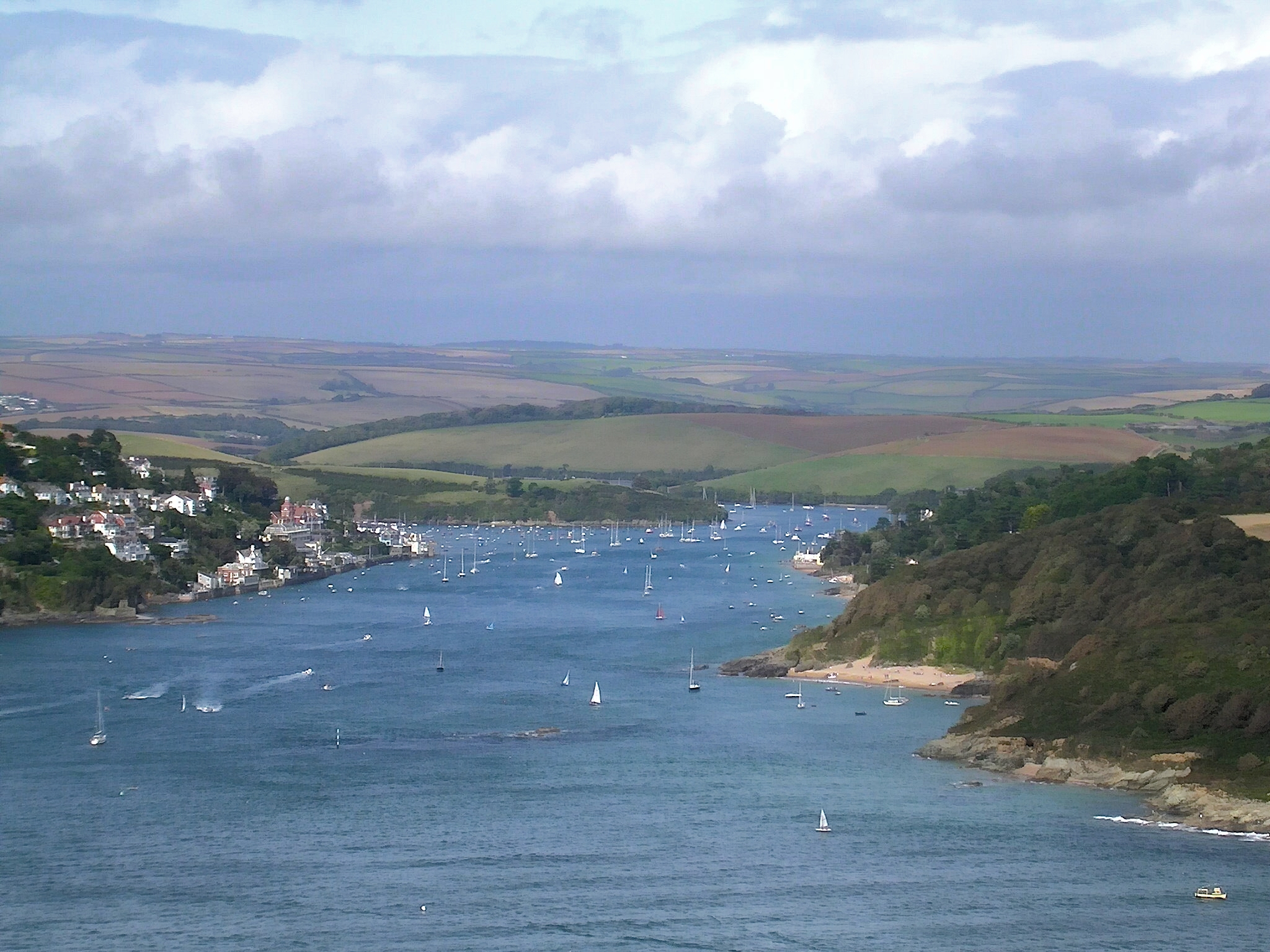
Kingsbridge estuary from Sharpitor looking upstream towards Kingsbridge. Salcombe is on the left, and Sunny Cove and other beaches are visible to the right.

The Kingsbridge Estuary (also, erroneously, known as the 'Salcombe Estuary') in the South Hams area of Devon, England, runs from Kingsbridge in the north to its mouth at the English Channel near Salcombe and lies between Bolt Head and Sharpitor to the west and Portlemouth Down to the east. The estuary is some 8.6 kilometres (5.3 mi) in length, with numerous side channels. Several of its creeks have independent names, including Blanksmill, Frogmore, Southpool, Batson and Bowcombe Creek (the most northerly portion of the estuary).

It covers an area of 674 hectares (1,670 acres) of which 446 hectares (1,100 acres) are inter-tidal. At high water the length of coast within the ria is 48.6 kilometres (30.2 mi). Although there are no major water courses entering the estuary, its total catchment area is 6,800 hectares (68 km^{2}).

The estuary is an extreme example of a ria or drowned river valley caused by rising sea levels rather than a true estuary. Prior to the sea level rise at the end of the last glacial period, it was the valley of a river. Its size is disproportionate to the size of the small streams that flow into it.

In February 1987, the estuary was designated a Site of Special Scientific Interest. It is a Local Nature Reserve and lies within the South Devon Area of Outstanding Natural Beauty (AONB).
