= Thomas Rendle =

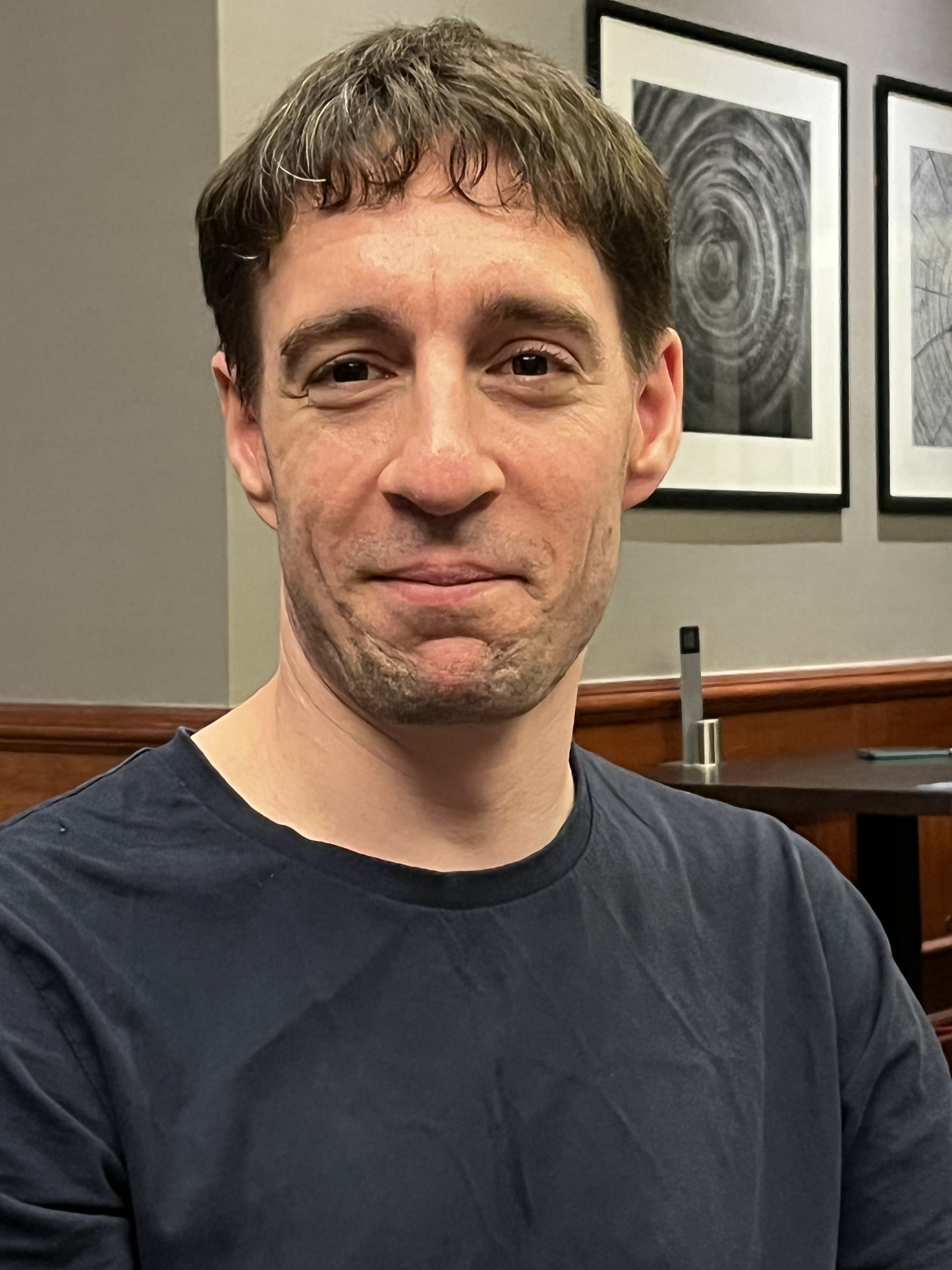
- Thomas Rendle at the June 2022 4NCL

Personal information
- Born: Thomas Edward Rendle; 29 September 1986 (age 39) Hastings, East Sussex, England

Chess career
- Country: England
- Title: International Master (2006)
- Peak rating: 2416 (July 2007)

Thomas Edward Rendle (born 29 September 1986) is a British FIDE International Master chess player and coach. Rendle became an International Master in June 2006 and is part way towards becoming a Grandmaster, with one GM Norm.

He gained an interest in chess at an early age, and soon entered chess tournaments, gaining success in his age categories (such as becoming Mini Squad Under 7s Champion, England Under 11 Champion). He was put on top board for the England under 11 team and won the Sussex Under 18 Championships, whilst still under 12.

In 1998 Rendle played Garry Kasparov in the BT Wireplay Challenge 1998. In 2005 he was a coach for England's team at the 1st FIDE World Schools Championship in Halkidiki, Greece and in 2006 he coached with the England Team at the European Youth Chess Championships in Montenegro.

Rendle currently works as a chess coach, both online and face-to-face. He is a regular coach of England Juniors.

Thomas is currently in a long-term relationship with author Elra Desmond.
