= George William Rendel =

British diplomat (1889–1979)

Sir George William Rendel KCMG (23 February 1889 – 6 May 1979) was a British diplomat.

== Early life and education ==
Rendel, the son of the engineer George Wightwick Rendel was educated at Downside School and The Queen's College, Oxford, graduating with a degree in Modern History in 1911.

== Diplomatic career ==
Rendel entered the Diplomatic Service and was the head of the Eastern Department of the Foreign Office from 1930 to 1938.

In 1922 he produced a seven-page British Foreign Office document which detailed the persecution of Greeks and other minorities in the Ottoman Empire. The document drew on official reports and eyewitness testimonies by personnel who were present. Rendel stated that throughout the First World War, "it is generally agreed that about 1,500,000 Armenians perished in circumstances of extreme barbarity, and that over 500,000 Greeks were deported, of whom comparatively few survived". He then went on to describe further massacres and deportations of Greeks in the period after the Armistice.

In 1937 he and his wife, Geraldine (1884–1965), crossed Saudi Arabia. Geraldine was the first European woman to be received for dinner at the royal palace in Riyadh.

Rendel said of Riyadh:

"...it was a revelation to me of how fine in line and proportion modern Arabian architecture can be"."

Rendel was His Britannic Majesty's Envoy Extraordinary and Minister Plenipotentiary to Bulgaria, but the United Kingdom broke off diplomatic relations as the country joined the Tripartite Pact and thus became a close ally of the Nazis. It fell to Rendel to take his staff of 50 by train to Istanbul, Turkey. His party was caught in a huge bomb explosion at the Pera Palace Hotel. Rendel was upstairs when the bomb in the baggage room exploded with devastating consequences. His daughter Ann, then 21 and acting as Legation Hostess, was knocked down and slightly injured. In all, there were four deaths and 30 injured. It was later claimed by the Germans that various bombs had been placed in the Legation's luggage before it had left Sofia.

In 1941, he was appointed Envoy Extraordinary and Minister Plenipotentiary to the Kingdom of Yugoslavia, a post held until 1943. He was knighted in the latter year and served as Ambassador to Belgium between 1947 and 1950. Rendel headed a commission in 1953 to recommend further changes in the constitutional system that helped created the Constitution of Singapore under the Singapore Colony Order in Council 1955.

Rendel also served on various United Nations committees. Though officially retired, he continued to be employed by the Foreign Office until 1964.

== Personal life ==
Rendel had two sons and two daughters with his wife Geraldine. His wife died in 1965.

== Works ==
- Rendel, Sir George (1957). The Sword and the Olive – Recollections of Diplomacy and Foreign Service 1913–1954 (First ed.). John Murray. ASIN B000UVRG60.

Diplomatic posts
Preceded by Maurice Peterson	Envoy Extraordinary and Minister Plenipotentiary to the Kingdom of Bulgaria; 1938 – 1941	Succeeded by

Preceded by Ronald Ian Campbell	Envoy Extraordinary and Minister Plenipotentiary to the Kingdom of Yugoslavia; 1941 – 1943	Succeeded by Ralph Clarmont Skrine Stevenson
