= Stuart Rendel, 1st Baron Rendel =

British Baron and politician (1834-1913)

The Right Honourable The Lord Rendel
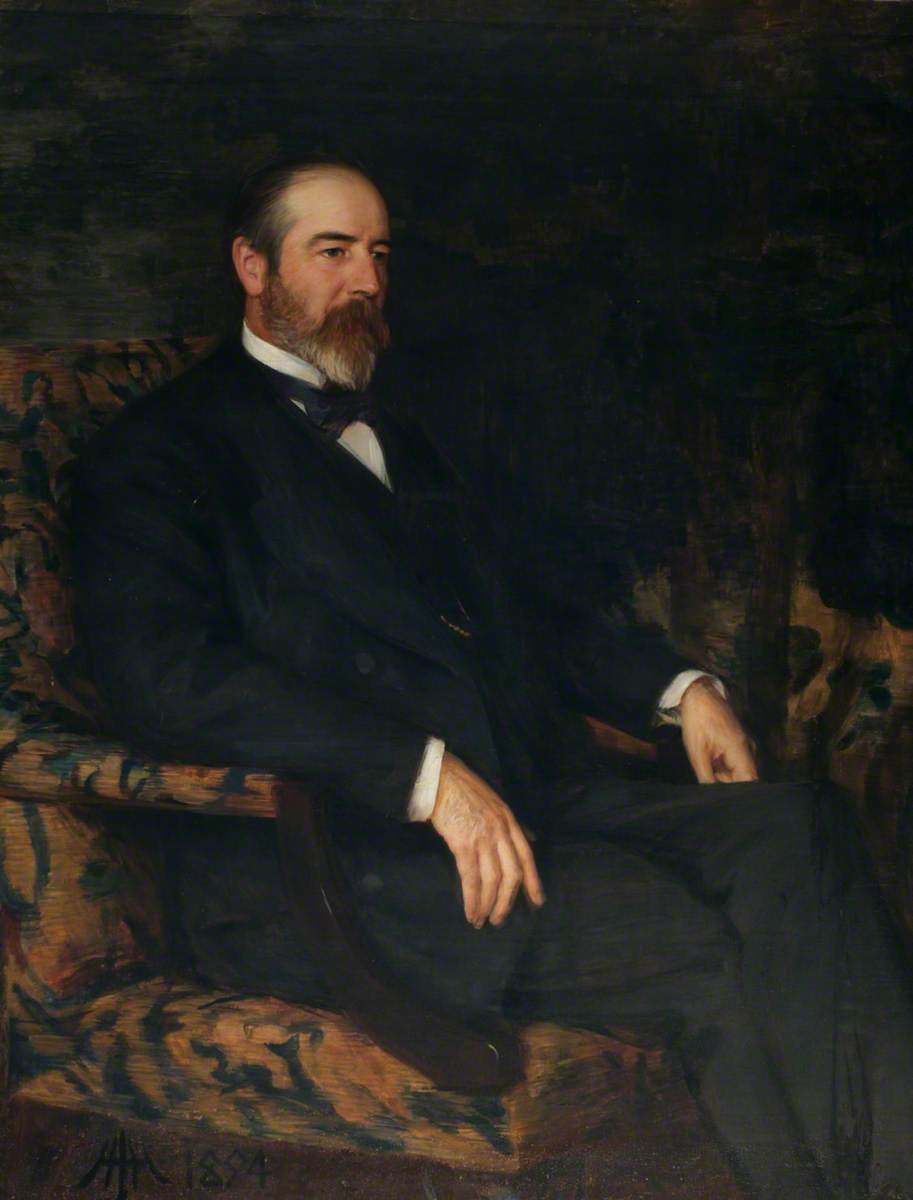
- Rendel in 1894

Member of Parliament for Montgomeryshire
- In office 12 April 1880 – 29 March 1894
- Preceded by: Charles Watkin Williams-Wynn
- Succeeded by: Arthur Humphreys-Owen

Personal details
- Born: 2 July 1834 Plymouth, Devon
- Died: 4 June 1913 (aged 78) London
- Spouse: Ellen Hubbard (m. 1857; died 1912)
- Parents: James Meadows Rendel (father); Catherine Jane Harris (mother)
- Relatives: Alexander Meadows Rendel (brother); Hamilton Owen Rendel (brother); George Wightwick Rendel (brother); Henry Gladstone (son-in-law); Harry Goodhart (son-in-law); Harry Stuart Goodhart-Rendel (grandson)
- Education: Eton College
- Alma mater: Oriel College, Oxford

Stuart Rendel, 1st Baron Rendel (2 July 1834 – 4 June 1913), was a British industrialist, philanthropist and Liberal politician. He sat as a Liberal Member of Parliament for Montgomeryshire between 1880 and 1894, and was recognised as the leader of the Welsh MPs. He was a benefactor to the University College of Wales at Aberystwyth and served as its president from 1895 to 1913.

== Background and education ==
Rendel was born at Plymouth, Devon, the son of the civil engineer James Meadows Rendel and his wife Catherine Jane, daughter of W. J. Harris. He was the brother of civil engineers Alexander Meadows Rendel and Hamilton Owen Rendel, and of naval architect George Wightwick Rendel. Educated at Eton College, Rendel then attended Oriel College, Oxford, graduating in 1856 with a fourth-class degree in classical studies. He was called to the Bar in 1861, but was mostly involved in engineering, becoming manager of the London branch of Armstrong Mitchell, the engineering company specialising in hydraulic power for civil engineering projects.

== Political career ==
Rendel was the Liberal Member of Parliament for Montgomeryshire between 1880 and his retirement in March 1894. Although an Englishman and an Anglican, he was popular in his Welsh-speaking constituency, and was nicknamed "the member for Wales" because of his vocal support for Welsh-related causes, such as the creation of the University of Wales. A close friend and associate of William Ewart Gladstone, he was recognised as the leader of the Welsh members of parliament. He also supported disestablishment. On his retirement from the House of Commons in 1894 he was raised to the peerage as Baron Rendel, of Hatchlands in the County of Surrey. Apart from his political career, Rendel was a benefactor to the University College of Wales at Aberystwyth and served as its president from 1895 to 1913. He donated land for the establishment of the National Library of Wales in Aberystwyth, where many of his papers have been deposited.

== Family ==
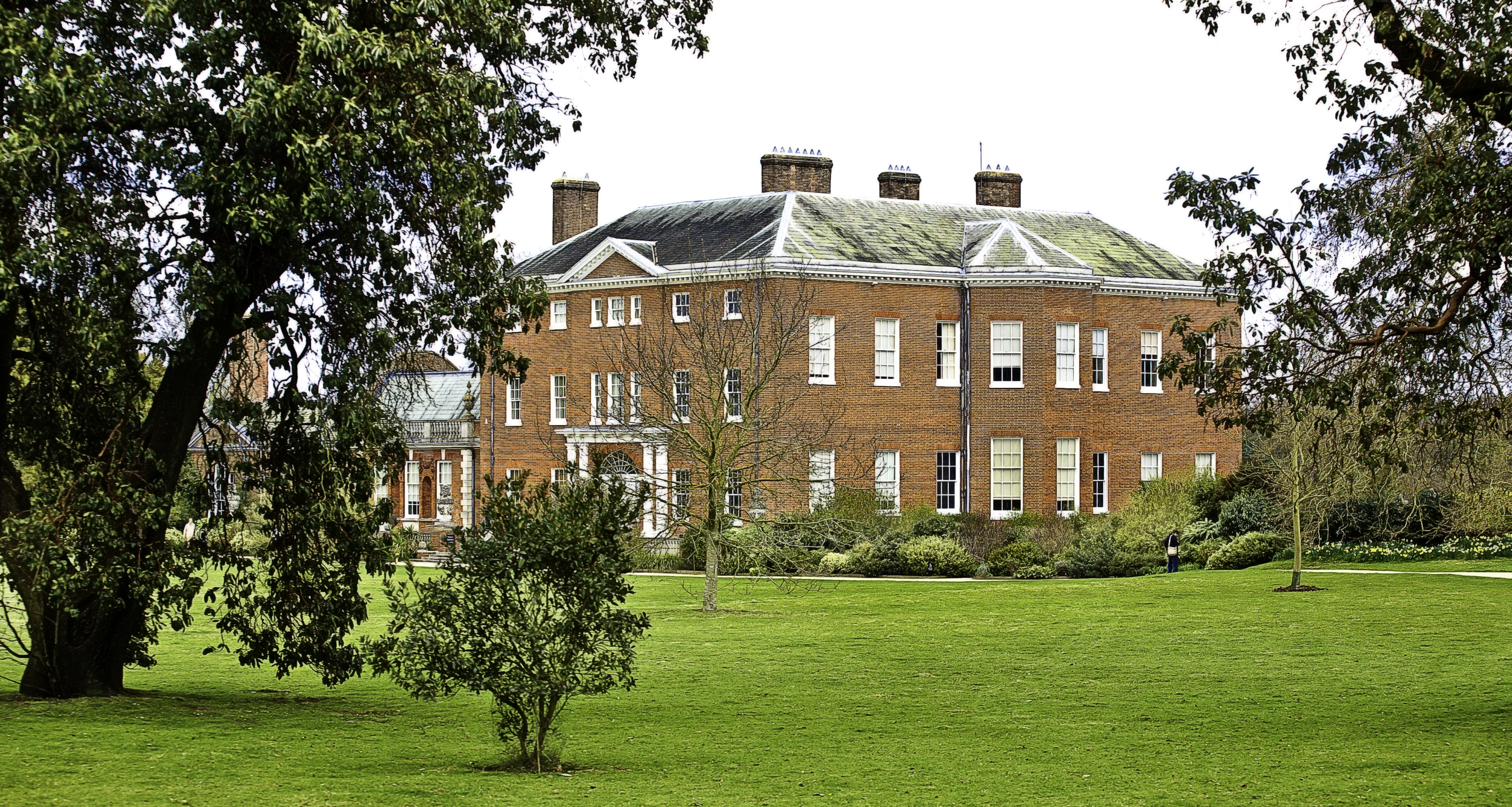
Hatchlands Park, Surrey, the seat of Lord Rendel

Rendel married Ellen Sophy, daughter of William Egerton Hubbard, in 1857. They had four daughters. The second of these, the Honourable Maud Ernestine Rendel, married Henry Gladstone, later 1st (and last) Baron Gladstone of Hawarden, the third son of Rendel's close friend, William Ewart Gladstone. In 1888 Rendel acquired Hatchlands Park in Surrey from the Sumner family. Lady Rendel died in May 1912, aged 74. Her husband survived her by just over a year and died at his London home, 10 Palace Green, Kensington Palace Gardens, in June 1913, aged 78. The peerage became extinct on his death, for he had no sons.

Rendel's eldest daughter, Rose Ellen, married Harry Goodhart, a former international footballer who became Professor of Latin at the University of Edinburgh. Their only son, Harry Stuart Goodhart-Rendel, inherited Hatchlands and became a celebrated architect.

== Later life ==
At the state funeral of William Ewart Gladstone at Westminster Abbey, Rendel acted as a pallbearer, along with the Prince of Wales (the future King Edward VII) and the Duke of York (the future King George V).

Parliament of the United Kingdom
Preceded by Charles Watkin Williams-Wynn	Member of Parliament for Montgomeryshire; 1880–1894	Succeeded by Arthur Humphreys-Owen
Academic offices
Preceded by The Lord Aberdare	President of the University College of Wales Aberystwyth; 1895–1913	Succeeded by Sir John Williams, Bt
Peerage of the United Kingdom
New creation	Baron Rendel; 1894–1913	Extinct
