= Charles Mitchell (shipbuilder) =

Scottish engineer and shipbuilder (1820-1895)

Charles Mitchell (22 May 1820 – 22 August 1895) was a Scottish engineer from Aberdeen who founded major shipbuilding yards on the Tyne. He became a public benefactor who funded notable buildings that still survive today.

== Career ==
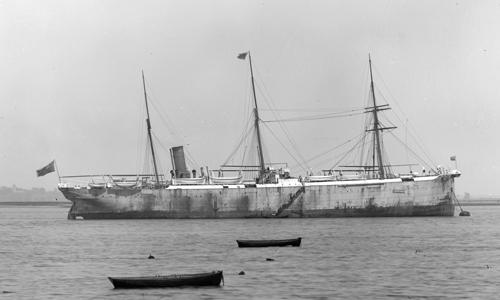
In 1873 C. Mitchell & Co. built the 4,935 GRT CS Hooper, the World's first purpose-built cable-laying ship. It was renamed CS Silvertown in 1881 and is pictured here in 1901.

He attended the University of Aberdeen. After an engineering apprenticeship in London, he became a ship designer working for John Coutts' Newcastle upon Tyne yard in 1842. He became a shipbuilder in his own right at the Low Walker yard on the Tyne in 1853. The cable ship Hooper, second in size only to SS Great Eastern and the first ship designed specifically to lay trans-Atlantic cable, was launched for Hooper's Telegraph Works at the yard on 29 March 1873 after four and a half months construction. That shipyard joined in partnership with the Armstrong yard to form Armstrong Mitchell in 1882.

He was decorated with the Imperial Order of St Stanislaus, 2nd class (normal for foreign nationals), which may be seen in the coat of arms over the door of Jesmond Towers. Jesmond Towers is a Gothic Revival building that was built in several stages in the nineteenth century. The main work is by the Newcastle architect John Dobson. In 1871, Mitchell was among those greeting the High Admiral, Grand Duke Konstantin at Newcastle Central station, after which the party drove on to Jesmond Towers. The Russian guests had come to visit the Low Walker yard and have a quick tour of the river.

In 1887 Mitchell commissioned the Art Nouveau church of St George, Jesmond from Thomas Ralph Spence (1845–1918), secretary of the Newcastle Arts Association. The building is tall and dramatic inside and of excellent workmanship throughout (commented upon by George Bernard Shaw on his visit in the 1890s). The stained glass is especially fine, and the mosaic figures were designed by Mitchell's own son, C.W. Mitchell. The Lewis organ was originally provided with air by two powerful hydraulic engines supplied by Mitchell's neighbour in Jesmond Dene, Baron Armstrong. In Jesmond he gave the land from the Jesmond Towers estate and £30,000 for the construction of the art nouveau St George's church (1888).

Until his death at the age of 75 he directed the shipbuilding activities of Sir W.G. Armstrong, Mitchell and Co. In 1897, after he died, the firm became Armstrong Whitworth which is now part of Rolls-Royce plc and BAE Systems.

His son was the artist Charles William Mitchell (1854–1903).

== Sources ==
- Obituary in The Times, Monday, 26 Aug 1895; pg. 7
- Swan Hunter History
