= James Murray Dobson =

This article contains text derived from the "Obituary", Institution of Civil Engineers (UK), vol. CCXVII, a document now in the public domain

James Murray Dobson (1846 in Plymouth, England – 27 February 1924 in Pescot, Longfield near Dartford, Kent, England) was an English principal engineer of the Buenos Aires harbour works in the late 1880s.

== Early life and education ==
Dobson was born in Plymouth the fourth of George Clarisse Dobson, M. Inst. C.E., resident engineer at Holyhead harbour in Wales, and younger brother of Henry Austin Dobson, who would become a poet. He was also a nephew of James Meadows Rendel, another noted engineer and president of the British Institution of Civil Engineers.

== Career ==
Dobson served his pupilage with his father on the Holyhead harbour works for two years and with Sir John Hawkshaw for one year. From 1865 to 1885 he was one of Hawkshaw's assistants, and among the various works upon which he was engaged was the Maryport dock, of which he was engineer-in-charge. He had a large office of his own in which he prepared the designs for the Stockton bridge for Charles Neate and Harrison Hayter, and designs of the ironwork of the lines and stations of the London Underground District Railway extension to Whitechapel for Sir John Hawkshaw.

Dobson went to Argentina to engineer the new Buenos Aires harbour in August 1885. He went with his staff, and two of the staff of principal contractor Thomas A. Walker. John Hawkshaw was the consulting engineer on the project.

In 1887 he was appointed chief engineer of the Buenos Aires harbour works, a position which he held until their completion in 1901. On the retirement of Sir John Hawkshaw in 1890 he became resident partner in the firm of Hawkshaw, Hayter and Dobson, of Buenos Aires—a branch of the firm of Hawshaw and Hayter, now headed by Hawkshaw's son John Clarke Hawkshaw, of London. In 1895 he was selected by the Argentine government to act on a commission to settle the level of high-water mark in the River Plate, and in January 1900 after the death of Hayter, Dobson returned to London where he carried on a consulting practice with Clarke Hawkshaw.

Hawkshaw and Dobson were consulting engineers for the:

- Madras Railway until the end of the contract with the Government of India
- Crown Agents for the Colonies for the Mauritius Government Railways
- Midland Railway of Western Australia
- West of India Portuguese Railway at Mormugao in the Portuguese colony of Goa in India
- Harbour at Coatzacoalcos, in the Mexican state of Veracruz
- Harbour at Salina Cruz, Oaxaca state, Mexico
- Belfast harbour, Ireland
- Holyhead harbour, Wales

Institution of Civil Engineers Director Engineering Policy & Innovation Mike Chrimes notes in his work British and Irish Civil Engineers in the Development of Argentina in the Nineteenth Century, that the project was almost certainly the first instance of a British firm having a resident partner overseas, and that the project's success was the result of the collaboration of Dobson as engineer and Hawkshaw as consulting engineer. Hawkshaw spent three months in Argentina. Chrimes concluded that this was at least partly a reflection of the value of the works (about 7 million pounds), but perhaps also because the project was carried out in an independent state and not in a British colony.

Dobson authored a book, Buenos Ayres harbour works ...: with an abstract of the discussion upon the paper, published 1899. For this contribution to the proceedings of the ICE he was awarded a Telford Premium (prize).
