= Marlcombe =

Proposed new town in Devon, England

Marlcombe was a proposed new town in Devon, England.

== Toponymy ==
The name was chosen through a public consultation because it was an archaic name for the area, dating back to the 17th century. Alternative proposals included Newton Clyst, Willowcrest, and Clysthope.

== History ==
=== Background ===
There has been a housing crisis in Devon for many years due to a lack of affordable housing. In 2010, planning permission was granted for the construction of the new eco-community of Cranbrook, which saw thousands of homes built throughout the 2010s. More development has occurred in East Devon throughout the 2020s.

=== Initial proposals ===
In 2021, the leader of East Devon District Council, Paul Arnott, said the council was looking to avoid creating new towns in East Devon. The proposal for the new town properly emerged in 2023. It was described as the new Cranbrook, another nearby new town. The name was decided by public vote. A community consultation on the proposed new town was carried out beforehand. The initial consultation saw 65% of respondents oppose the new town. East Devon District Council described it as "a self-sufficient and dynamic community with a distinctive character". The proposed site covered 500 hectares. In September 2024, two concept masterplans were made public.

=== Development ===
In September 2025, Marlcombe was named on a shortlist of 12 locations by the Labour government's New Towns Taskforce. In March 2026 the Housing minister did not include it in the final list of seven planned new towns.

The town would reportedly have been a standalone community rather than a commuter suburb of Exeter. This new town in East Devon, along with the new developments in Plymouth, would have accommodated up to 20,000 homes. Local authorities proposed a target of 40% affordable housing. The settlement would have reportedly include new community facilities and employment opportunities. The town would have been built along the banks of the River Clyst. Construction of the first homes was expected by the early 2030s. The new town would have had green spaces, health facilities, schools, and cycle routes with links to the nearby Clyst Valley Regional Park. The towns infrastructure may not have been provided by South West Water and would reportedly have needed multiple treatment plants. It would have had a new town centre, shops, leisure facilities, a cemetery, a park and ride, and gypsy pitches. Around 2,500 new homes had been expected by 2040. In March 2026, Marlcombe was not on a list of confirmed locations for new towns meaning the future of the project is uncertain.

== Geography ==
The proposed town would be constructed between the A30 and A3052 roads, immediately south of Exeter Airport. It would border the Devon County Showground at Westpoint. Much of the land between the dual carriageways is currently used as farmland, while some parts of the site include ancient woodland. The town was to be located on land between the Crealy Theme Park & Resort and the nearby Hill Barton business park. Marlcombe was to be close to the villages of Clyst Honiton, Clyst St Mary, Farringdon, Sowton, and Westcott.

== Gallery ==
=== Alder Croft ===
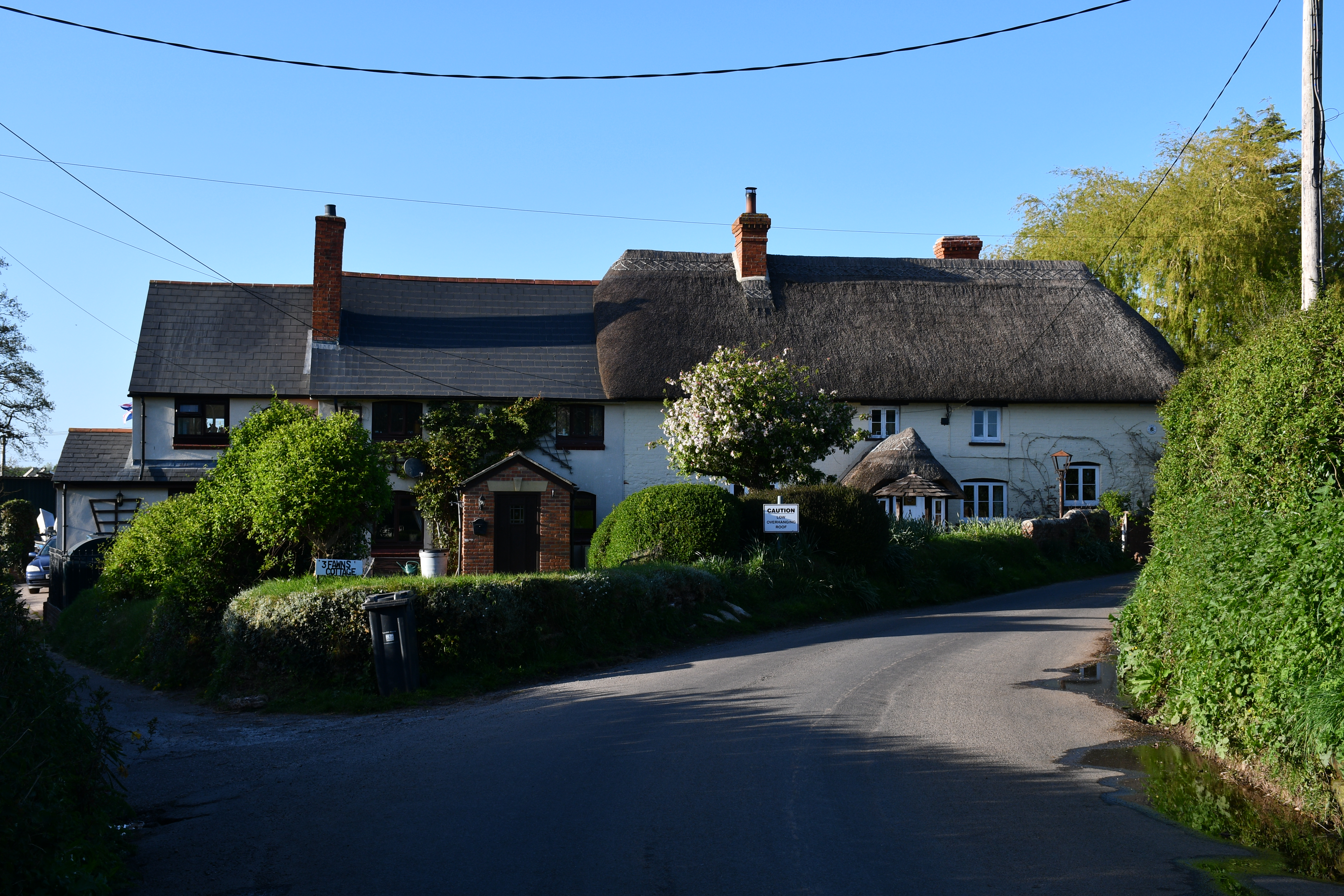
Alder Croft

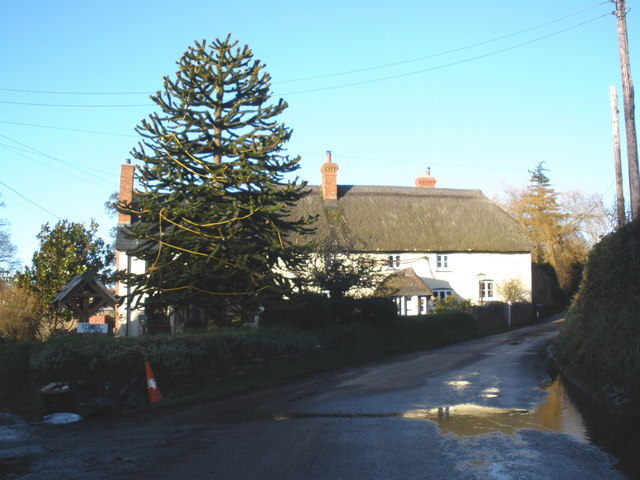
Alder Croft

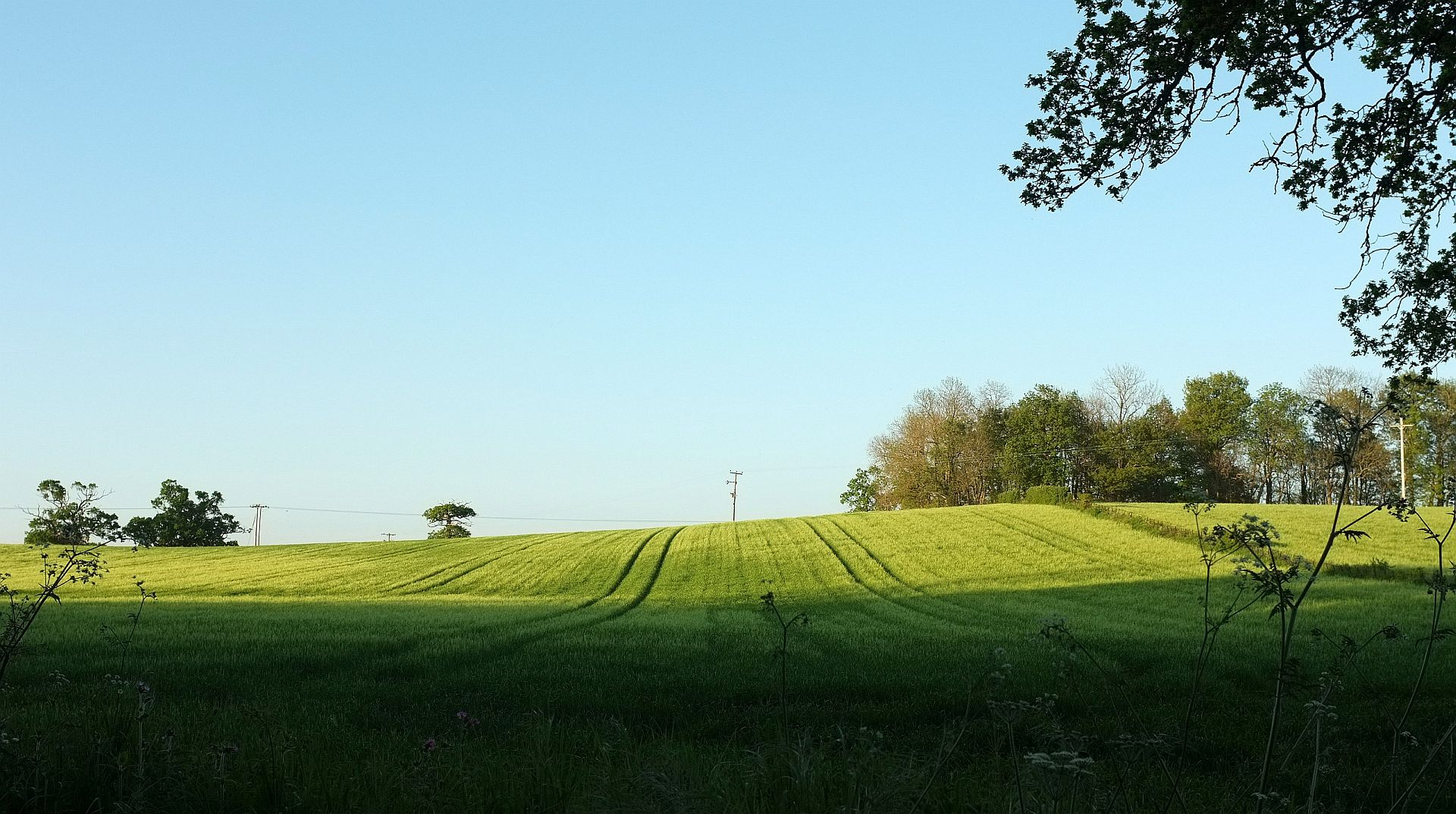
Field near Alder Croft

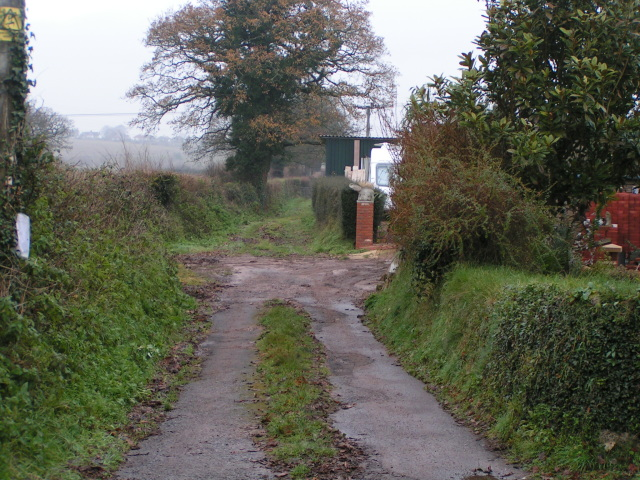
Green Lane

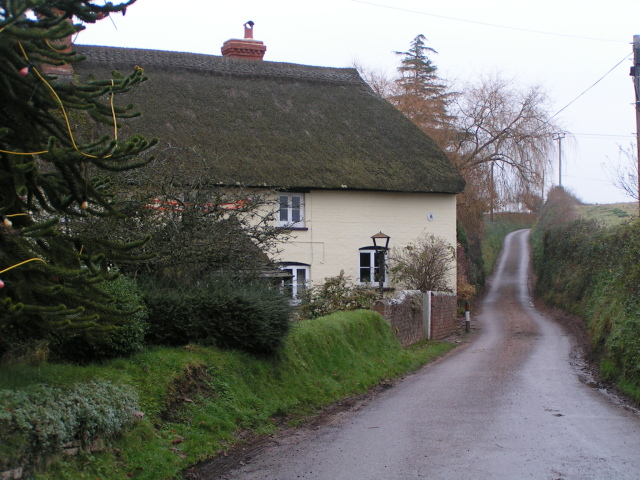
Cottage and country lane near Clyst St Mary

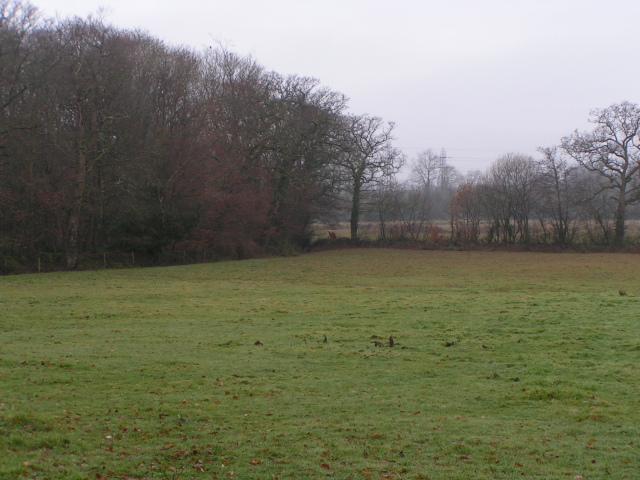
Field near Clyst St Mary

=== Bishops Court ===
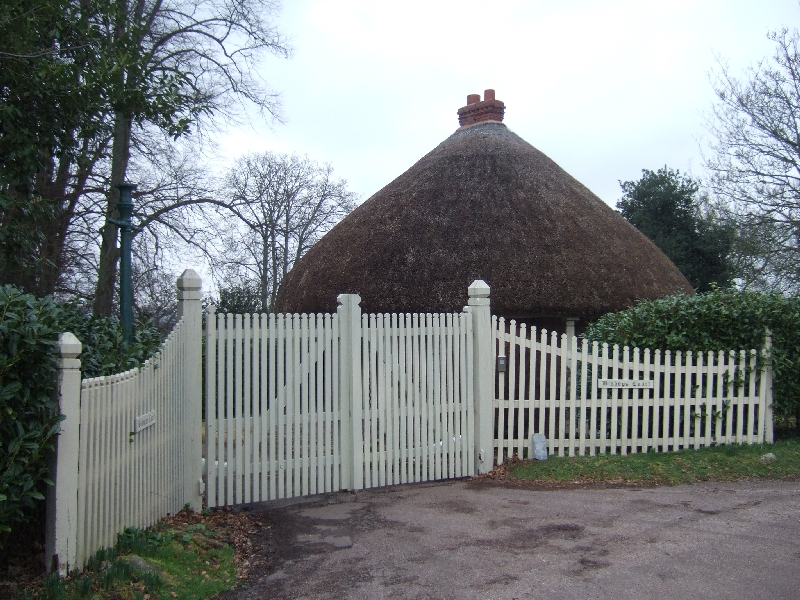
East Lodge of Bishop's Court

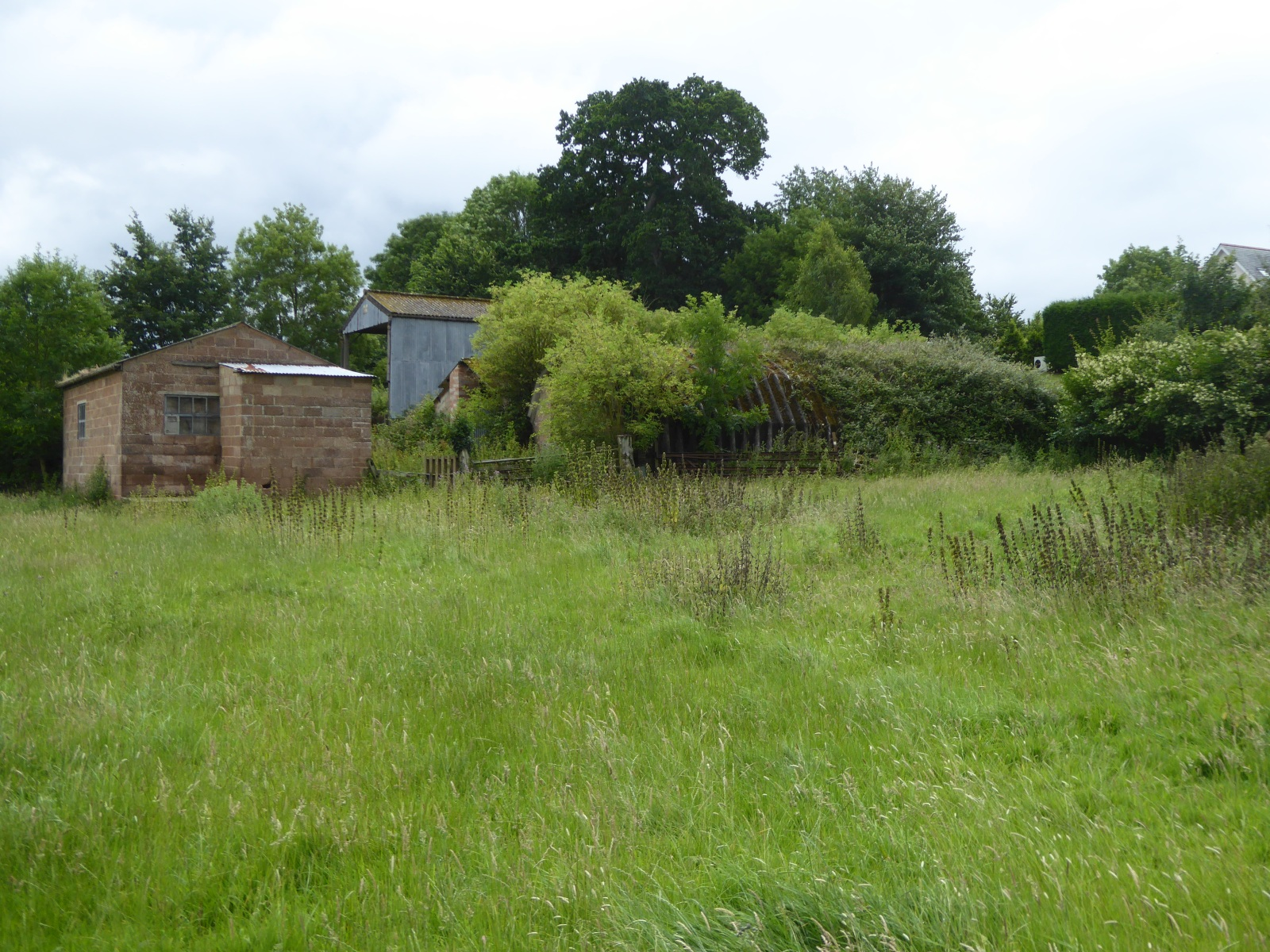
Farm buildings near Bishop's Court

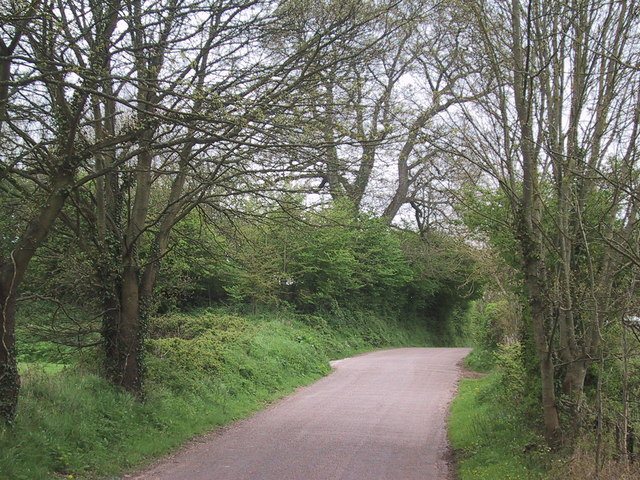
Minor road at Bishop's Court

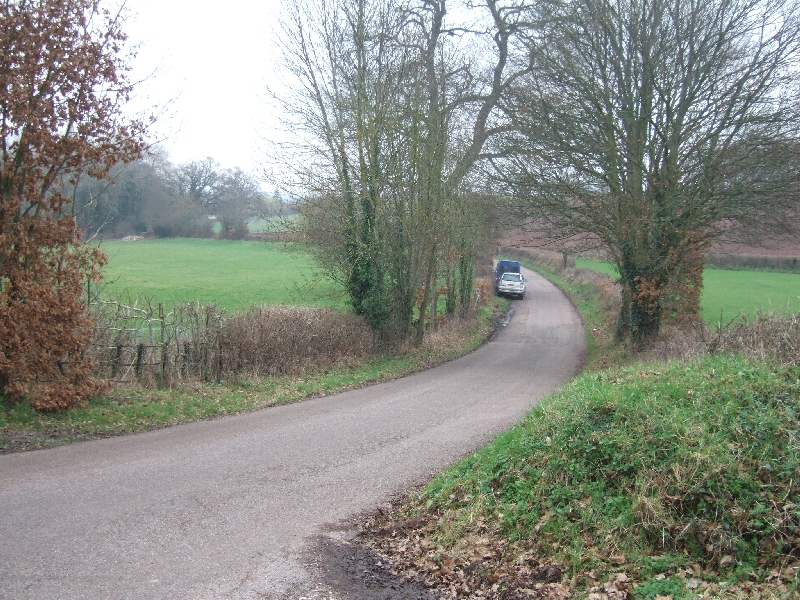
Bishops Court Lane

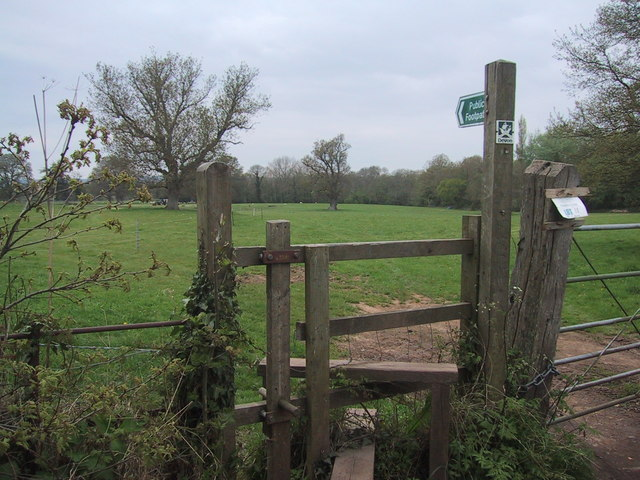
Footpath to Sowton

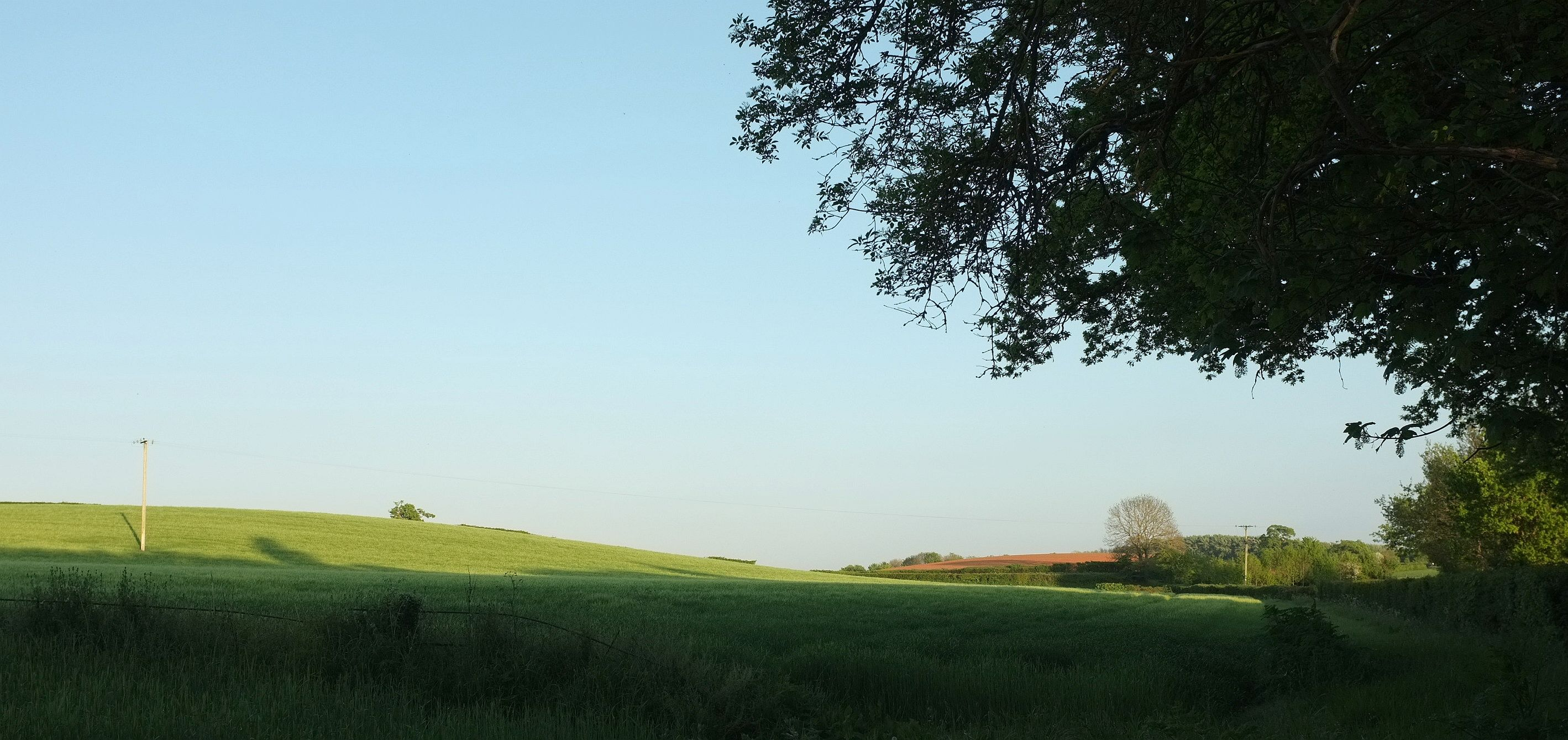
Farmland near Bishop's Court

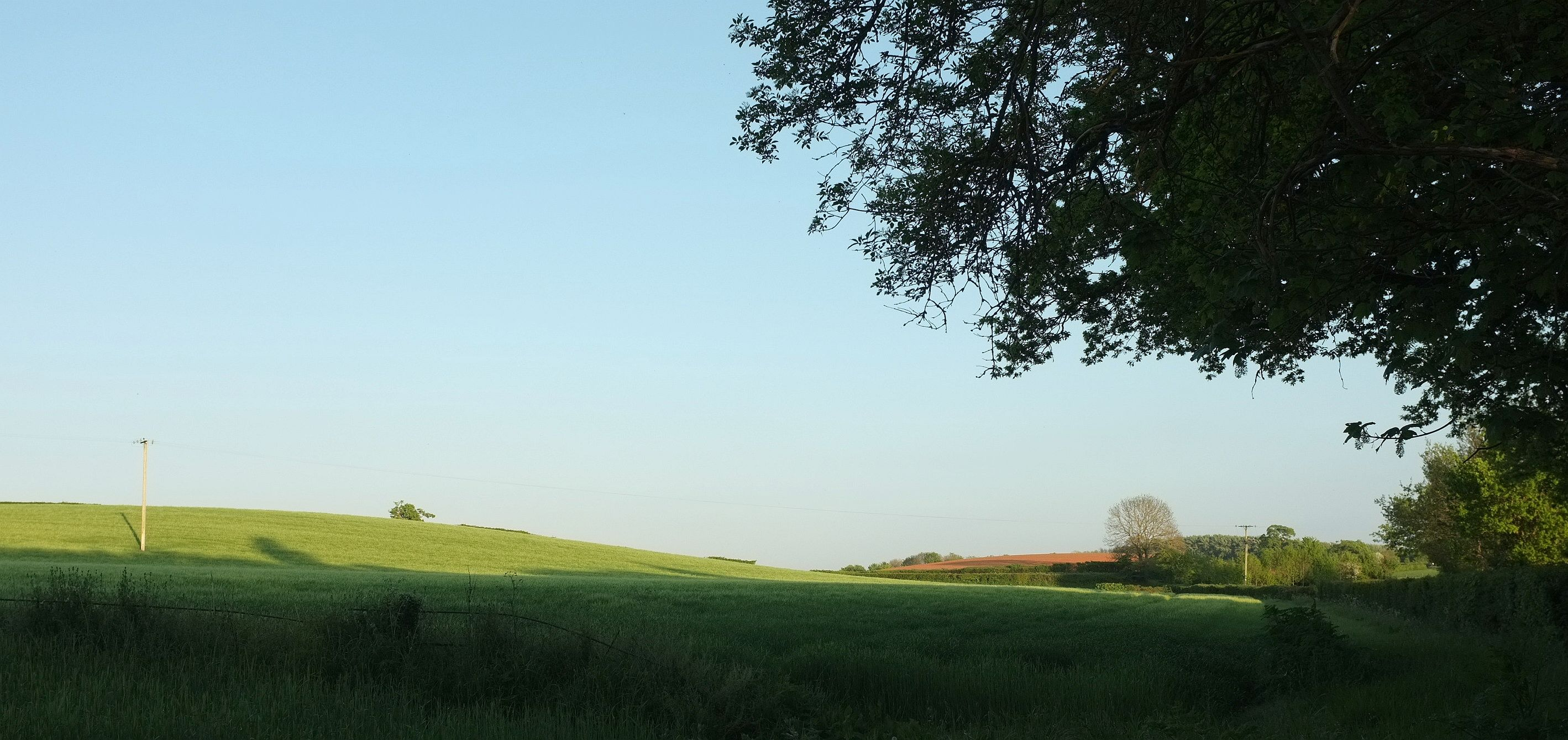
Farmland near Bishop's Court

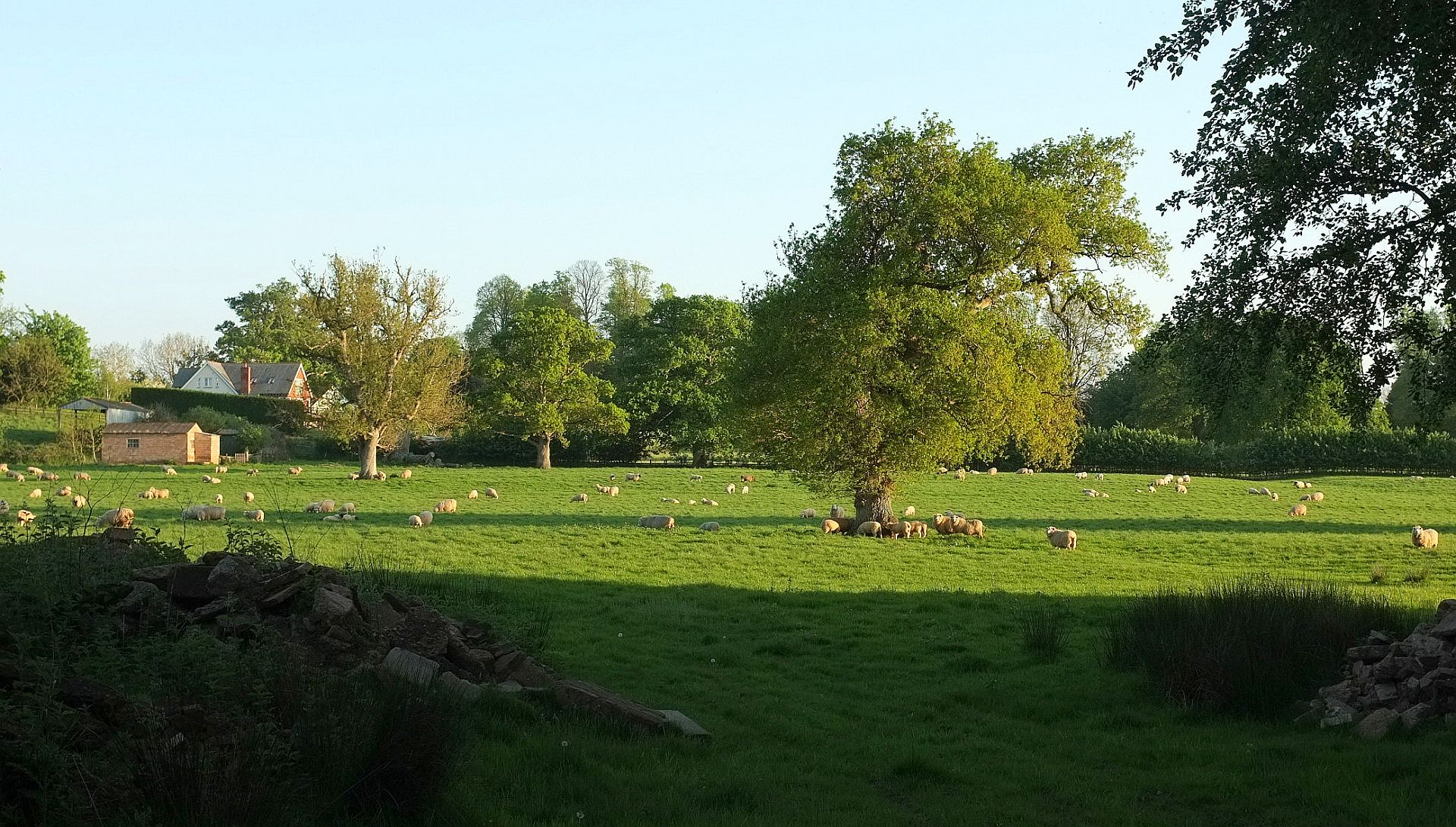
Sheep near Bishop's Court

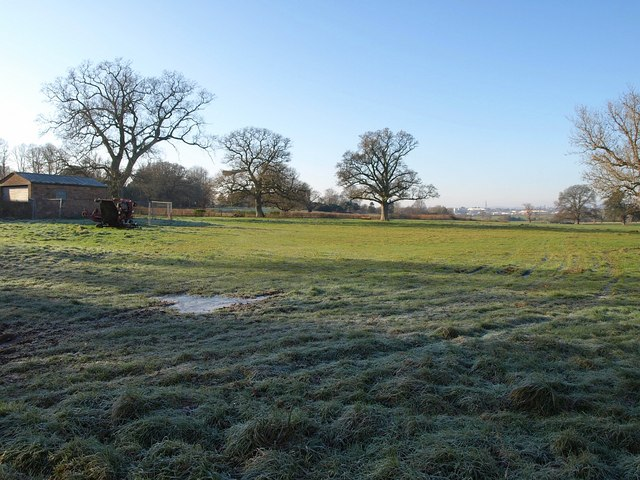
Meadow at Bishop's Court

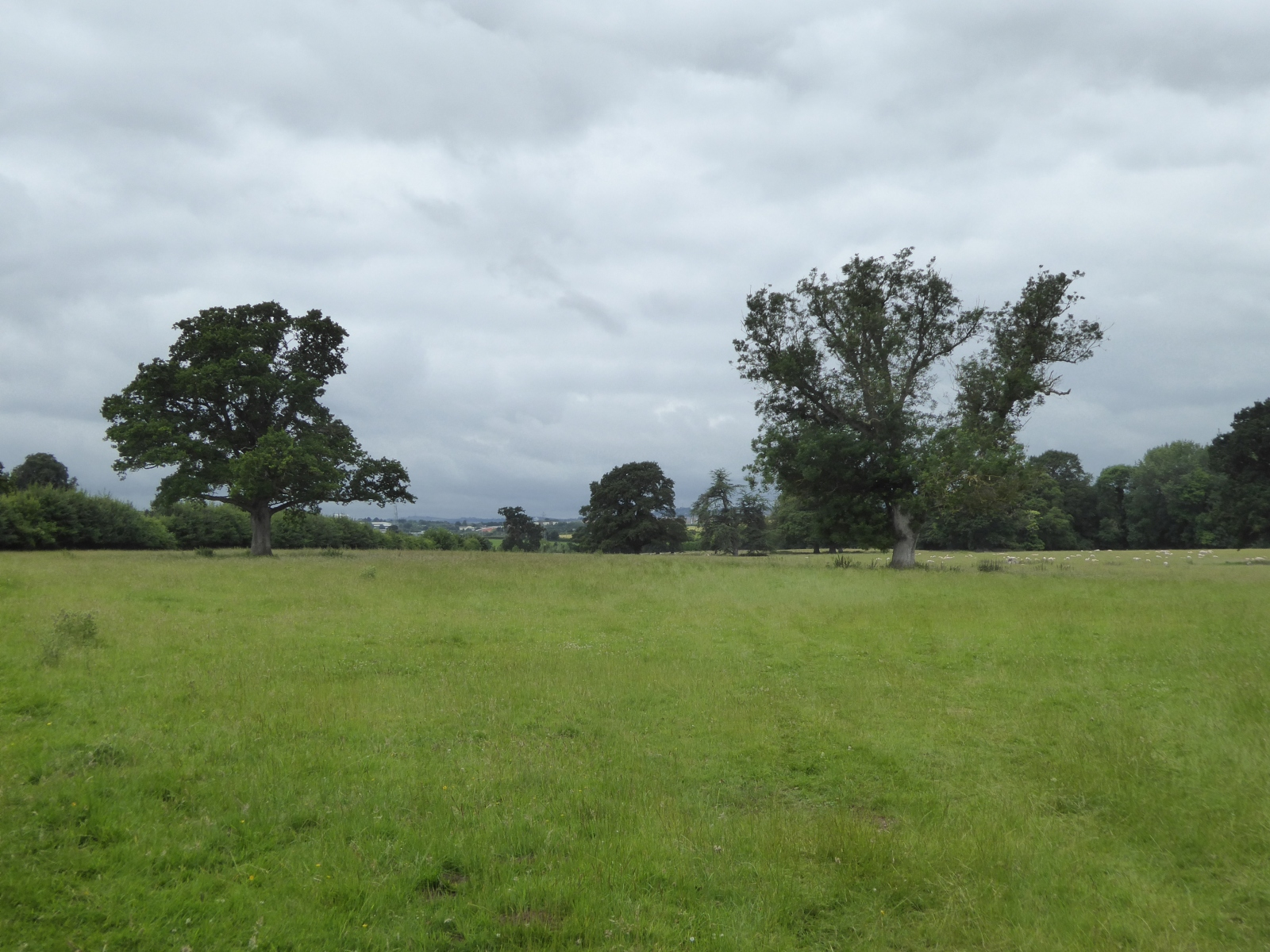
Grassland by path to Sowton

=== Denbow Farm ===
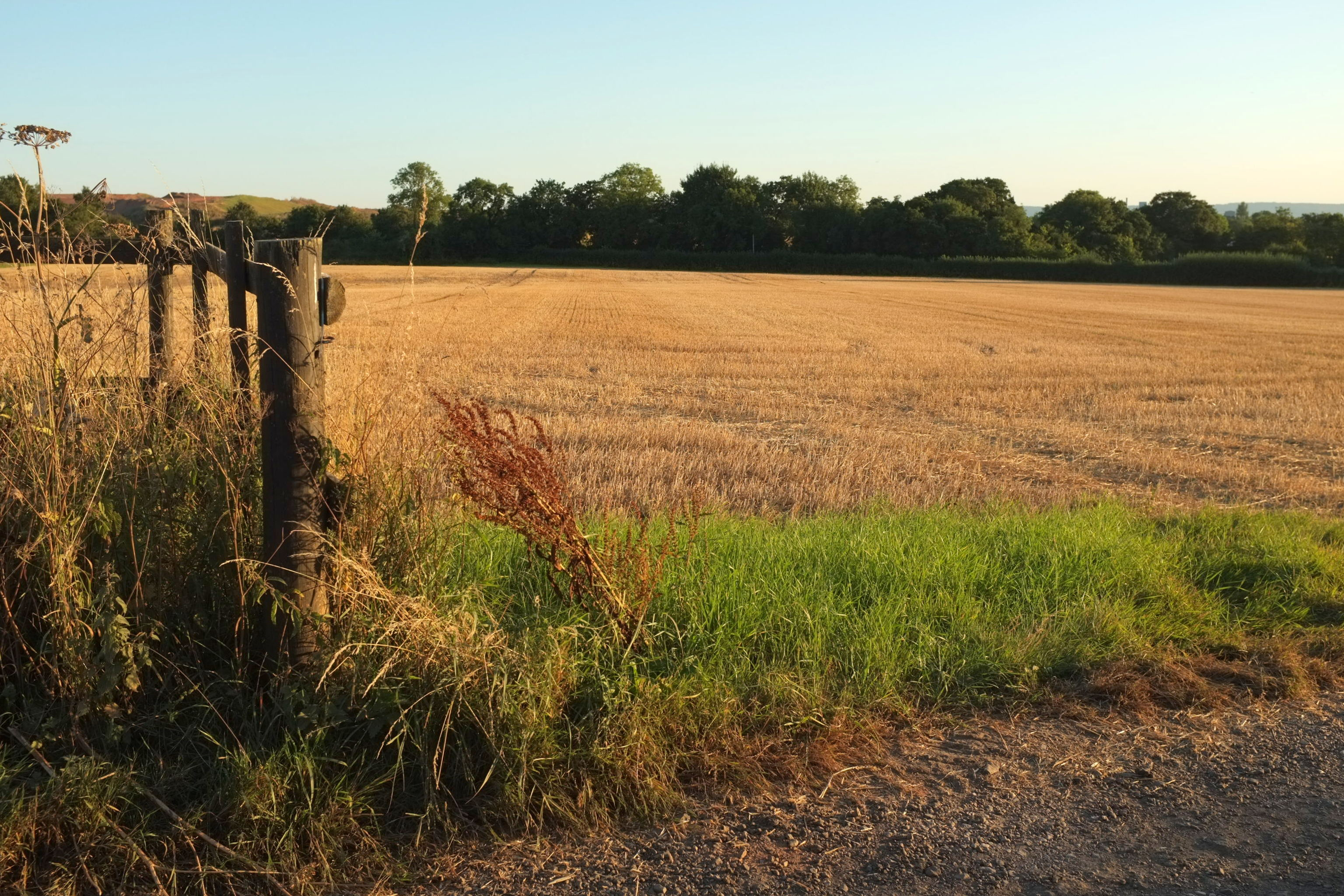
Field at Denbow Farm

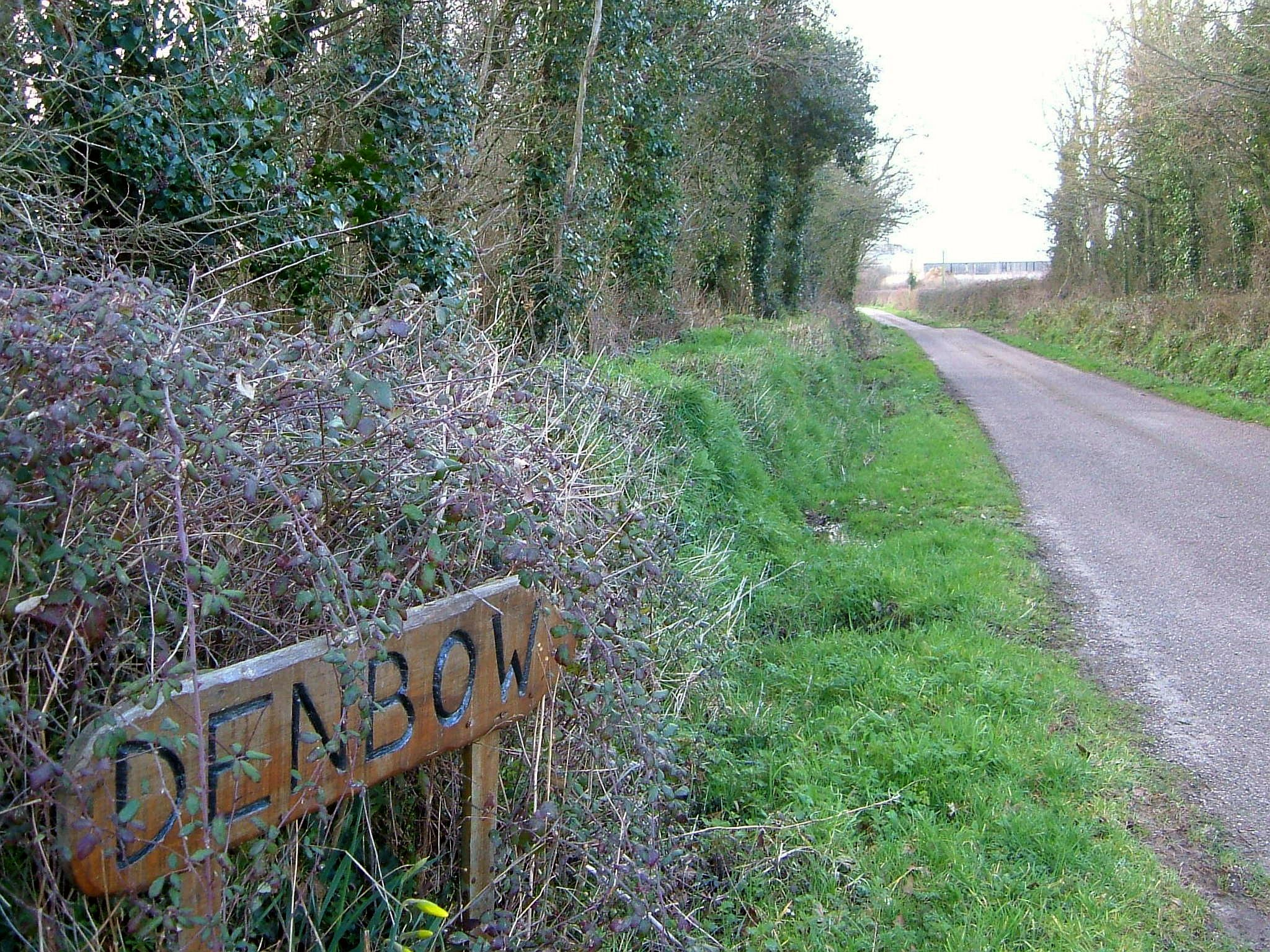
Farm lane to Denbow Farm

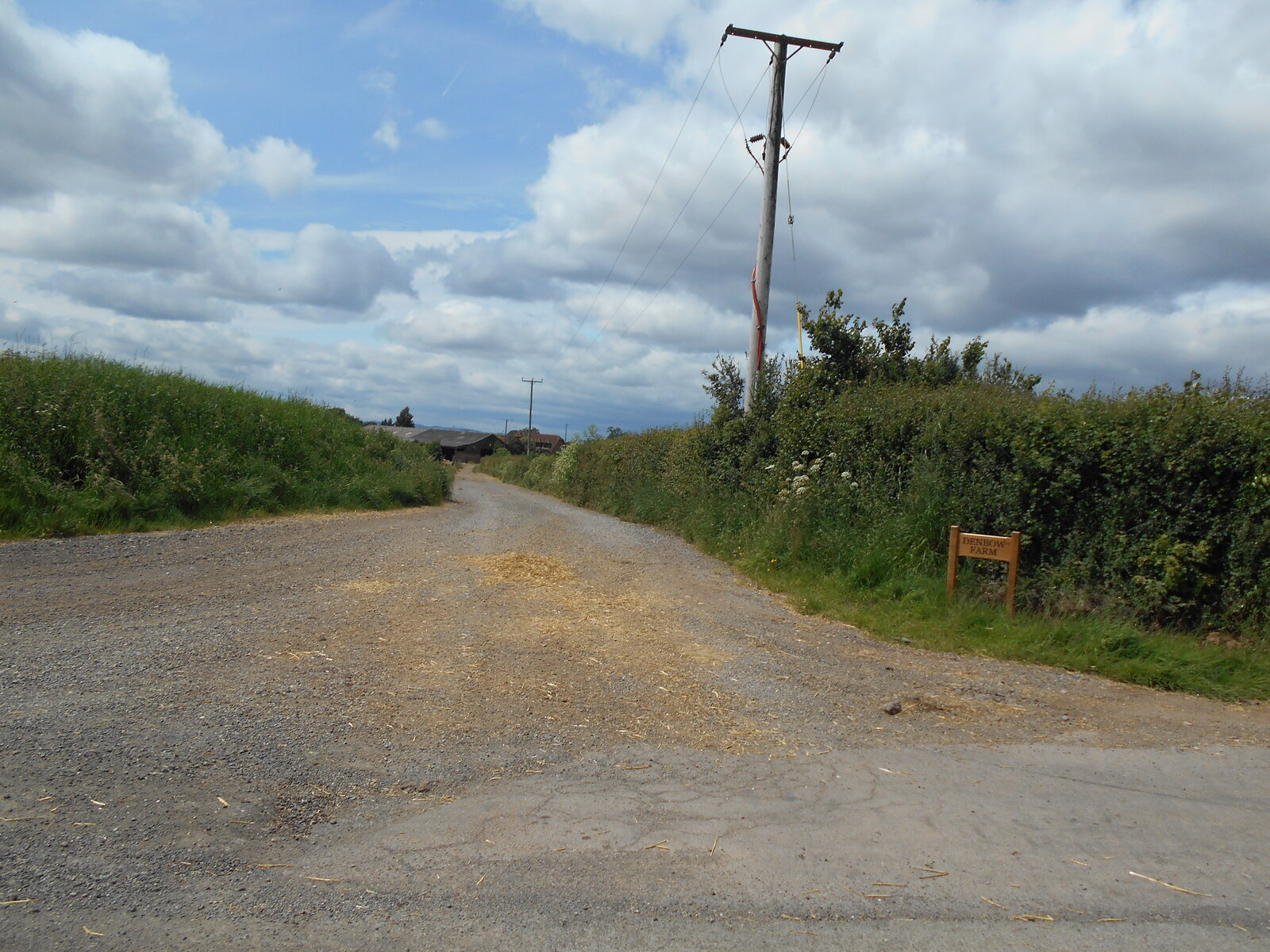
Road to Denbow Farm

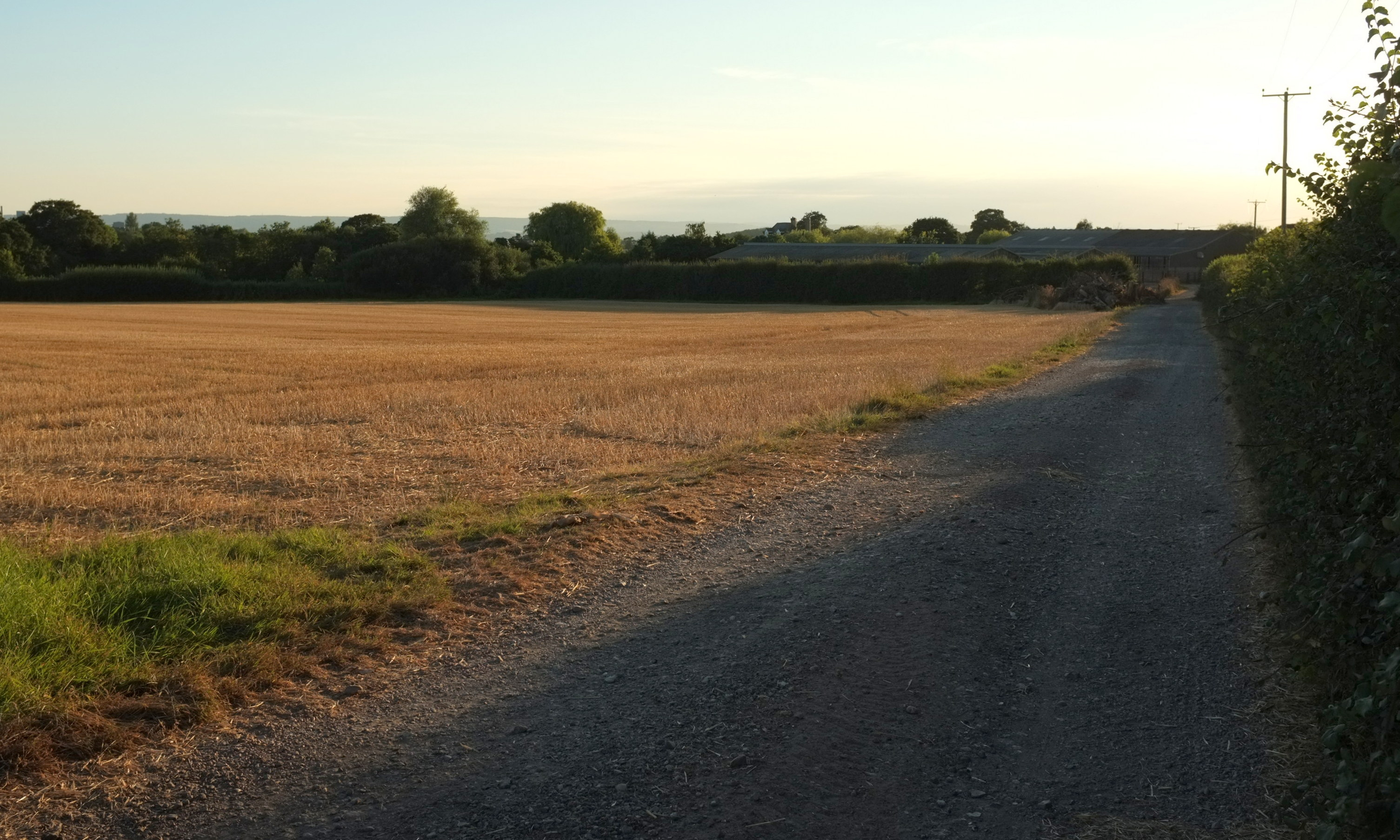
Field at Denbow Farm

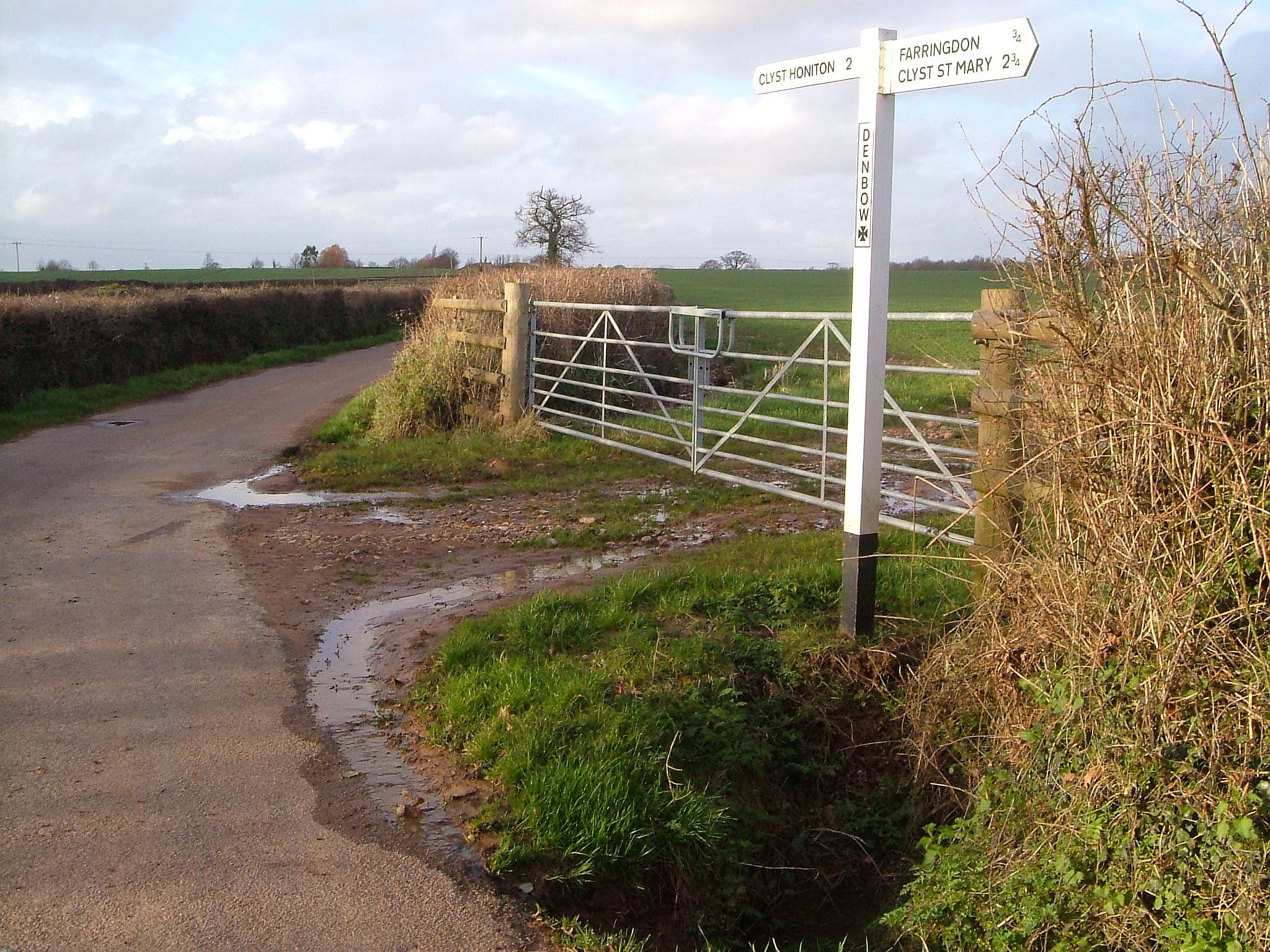
Denbow Cross

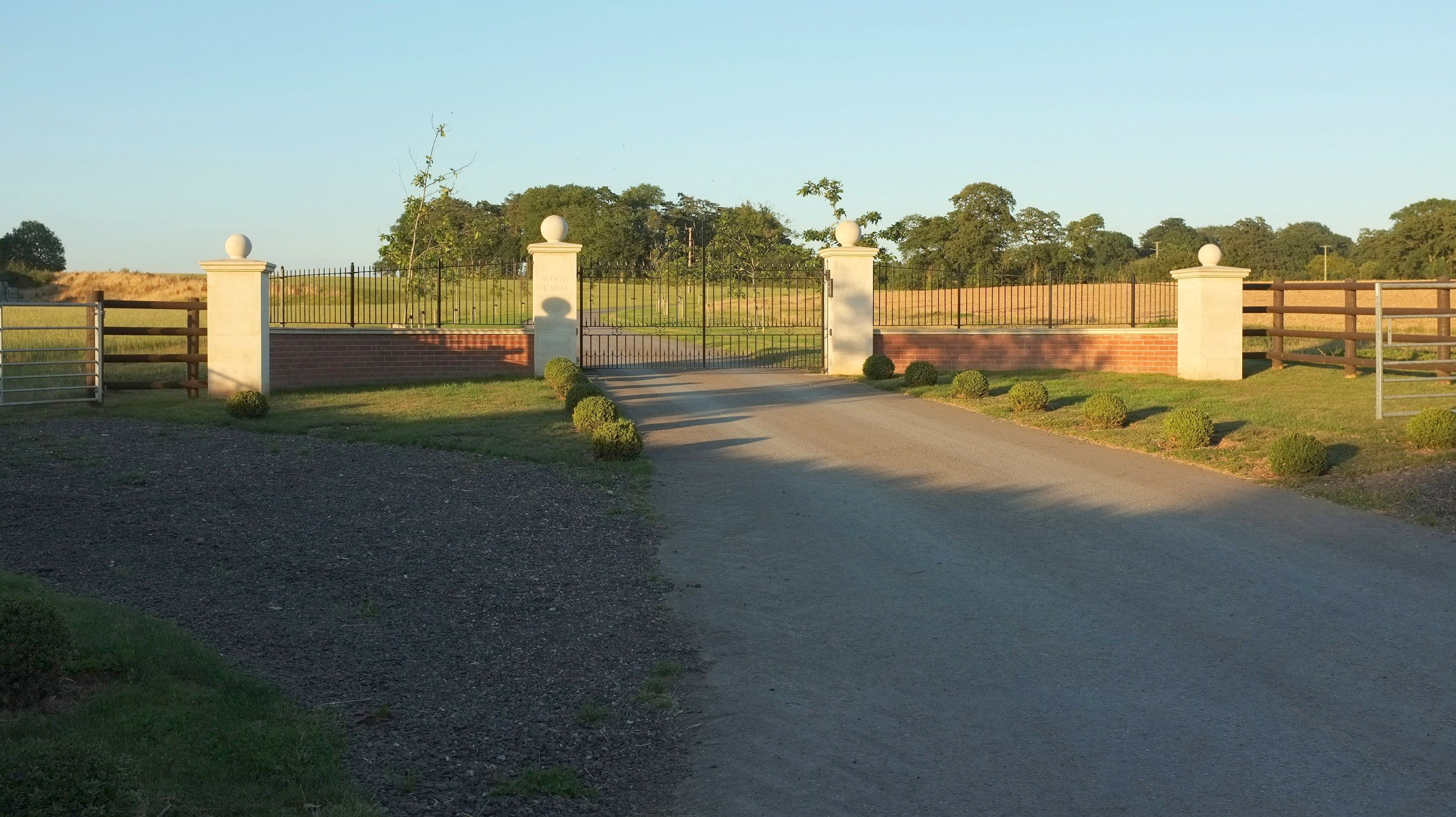
Gates at Denbow Cross

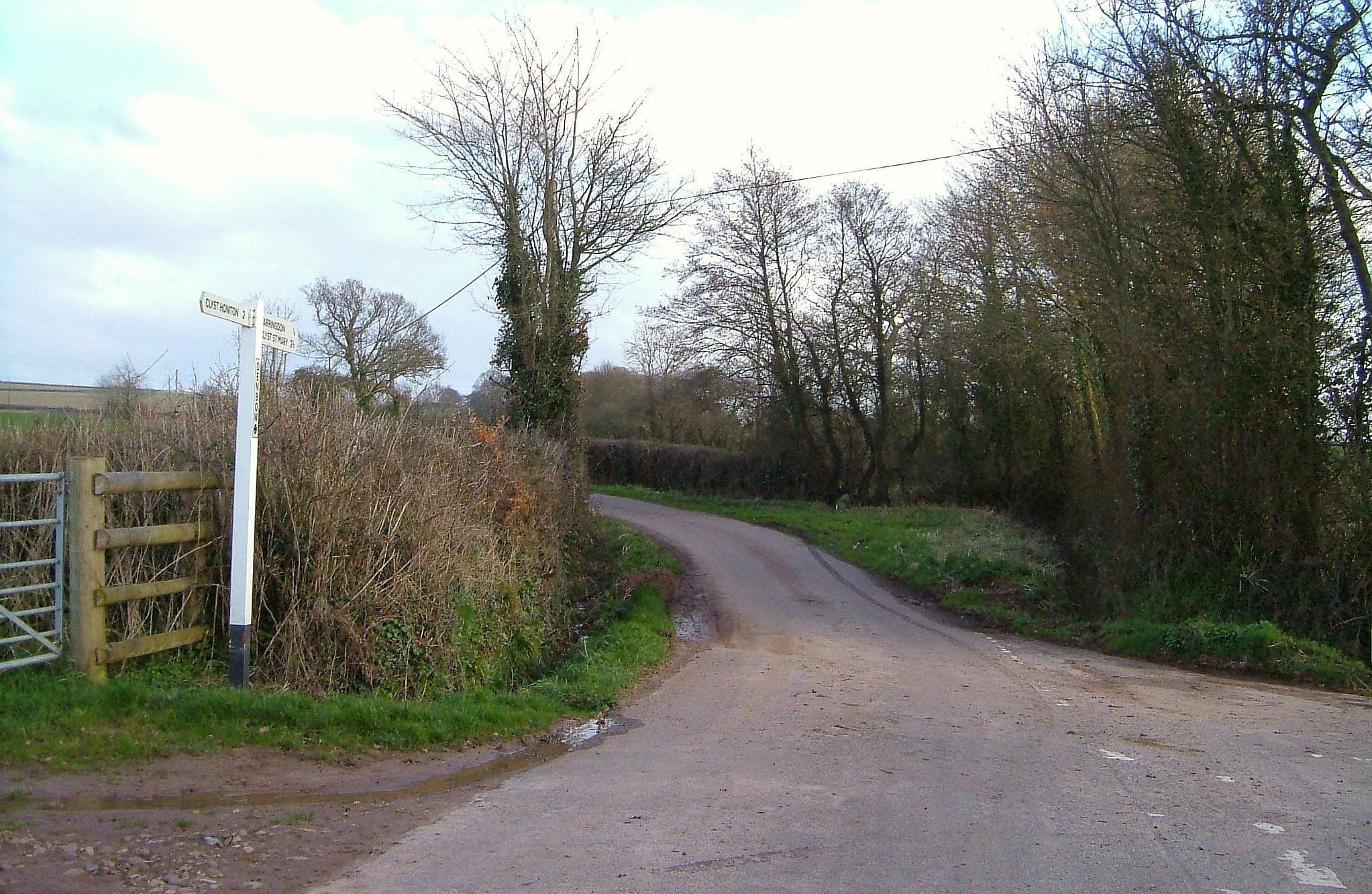
Denbow Cross

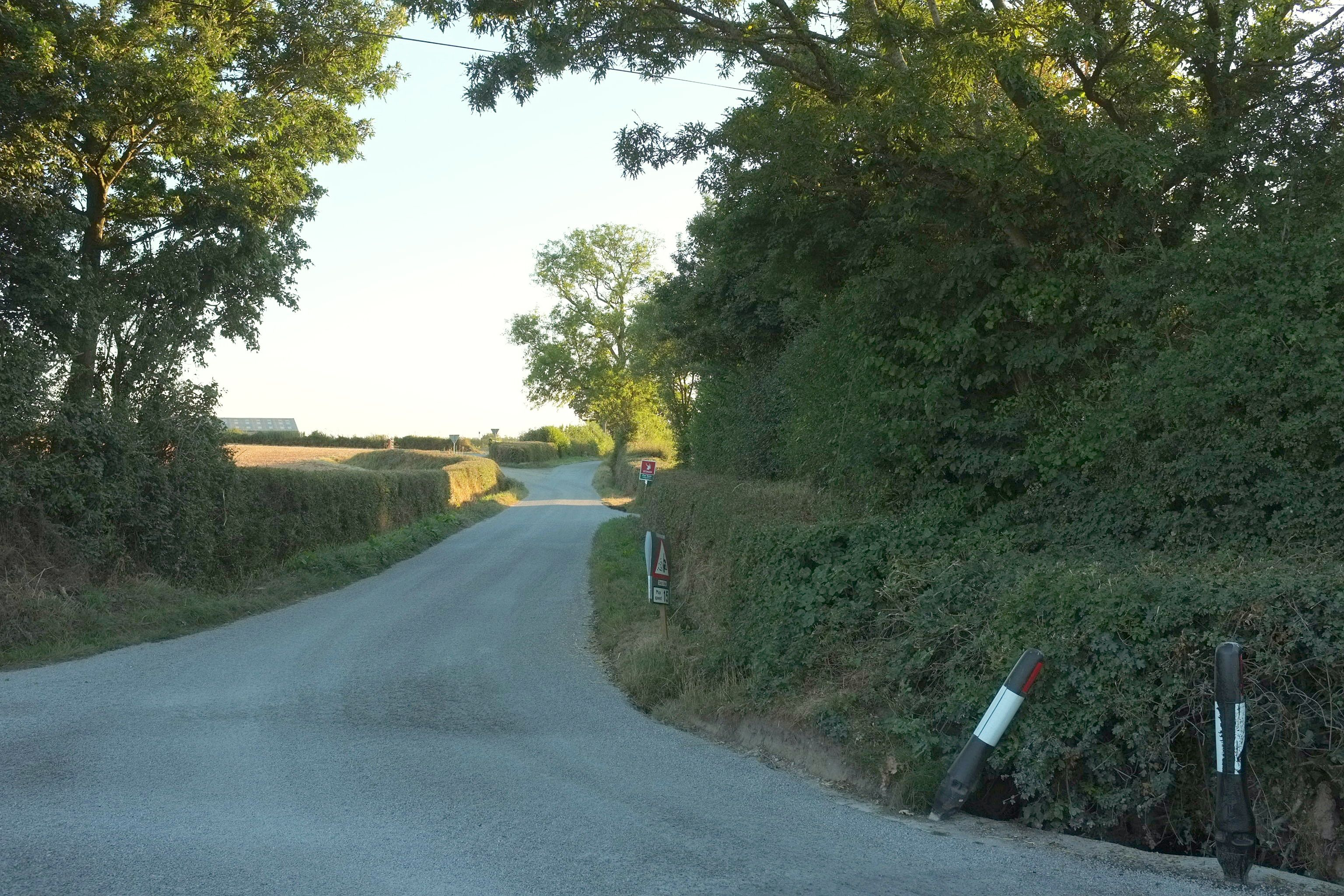
Lane from Denbow Cross

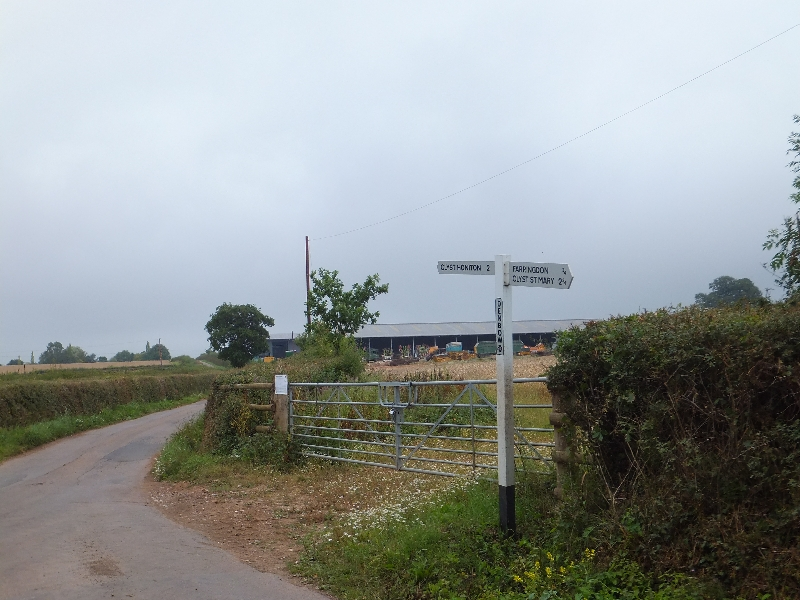
Denbow Cross and farm buildings

=== Farringdon ===
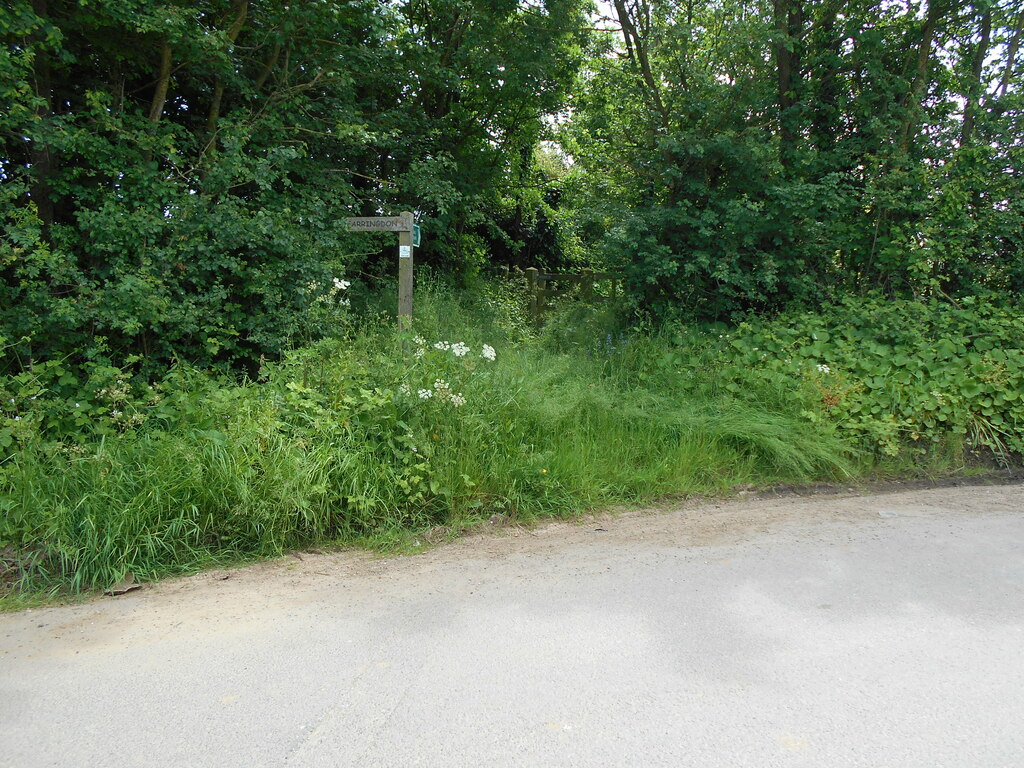
Minor road

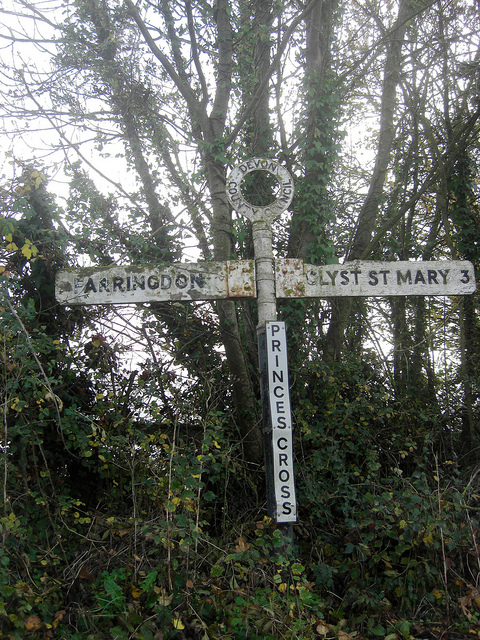
Old Direction Sign

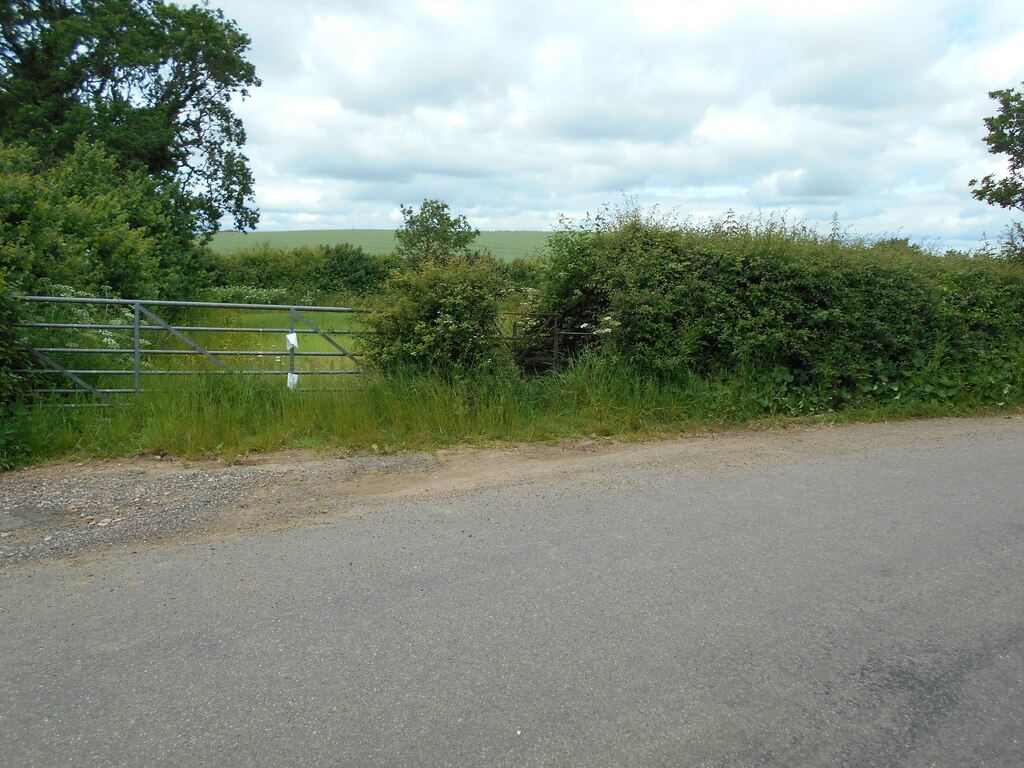
Farmland

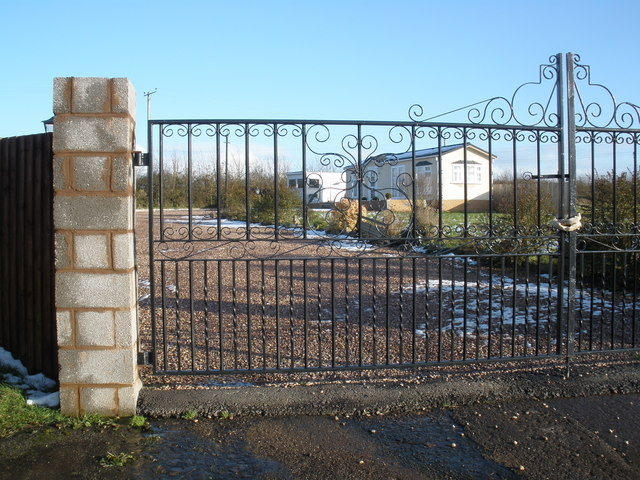
Entrance to mobile homes park

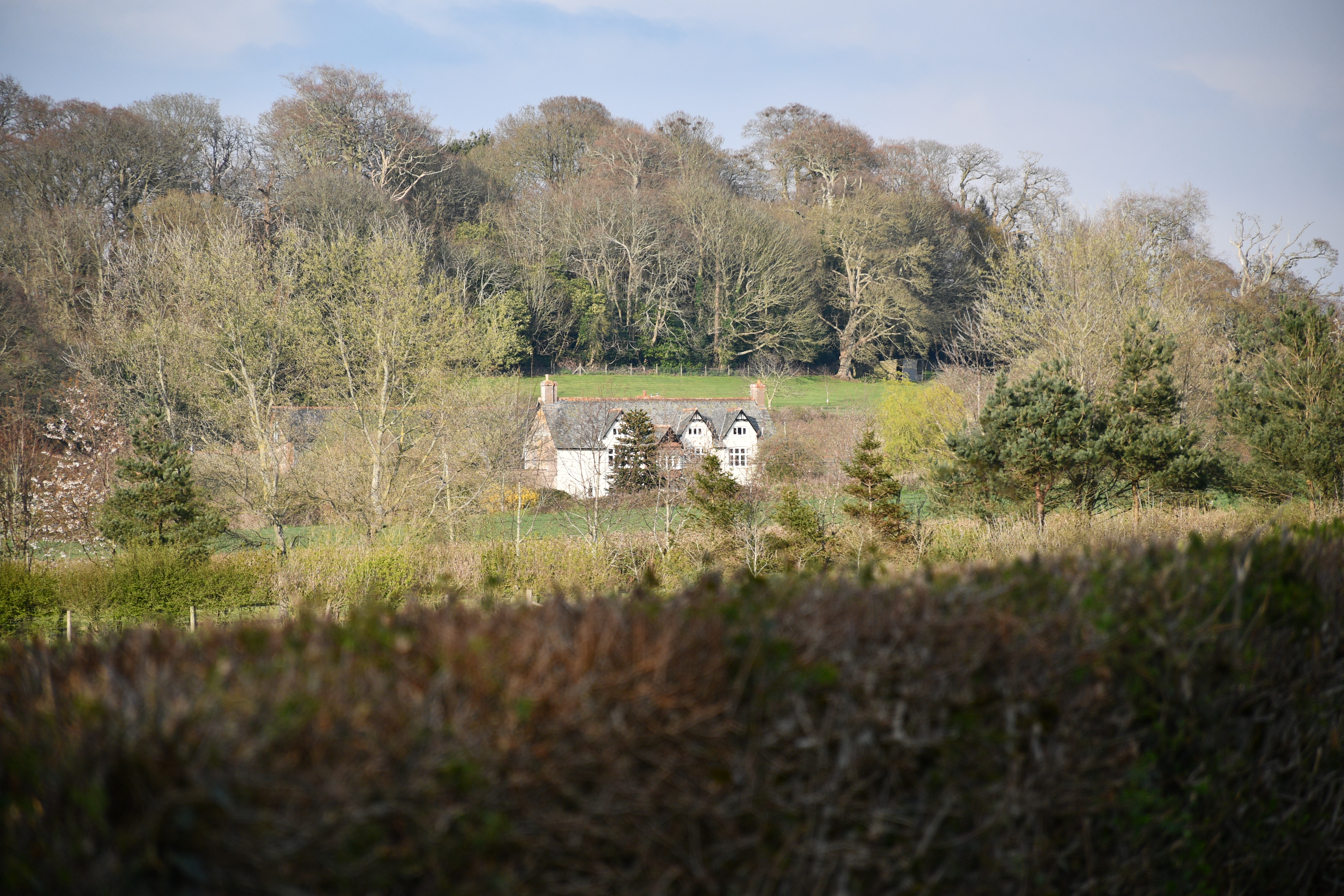
Landscape

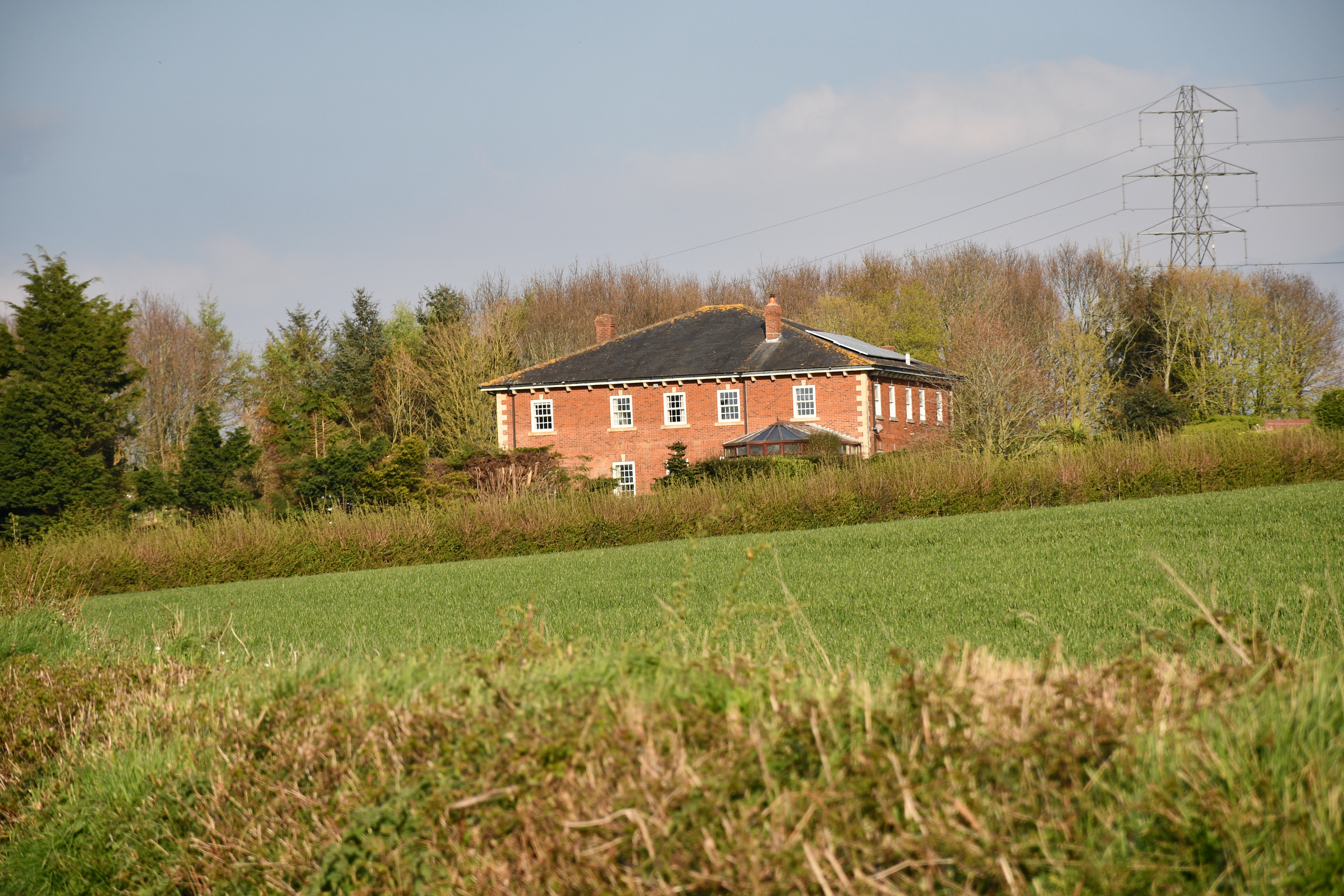
House

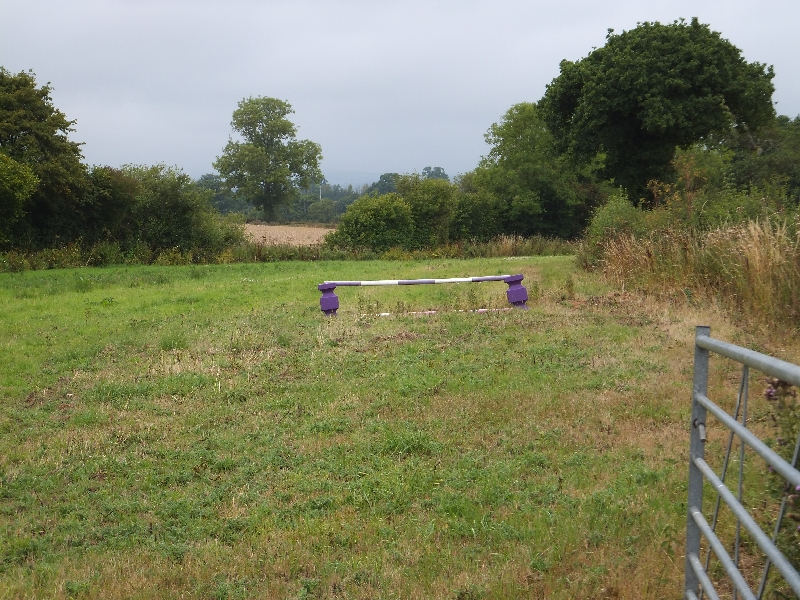
Long narrow field

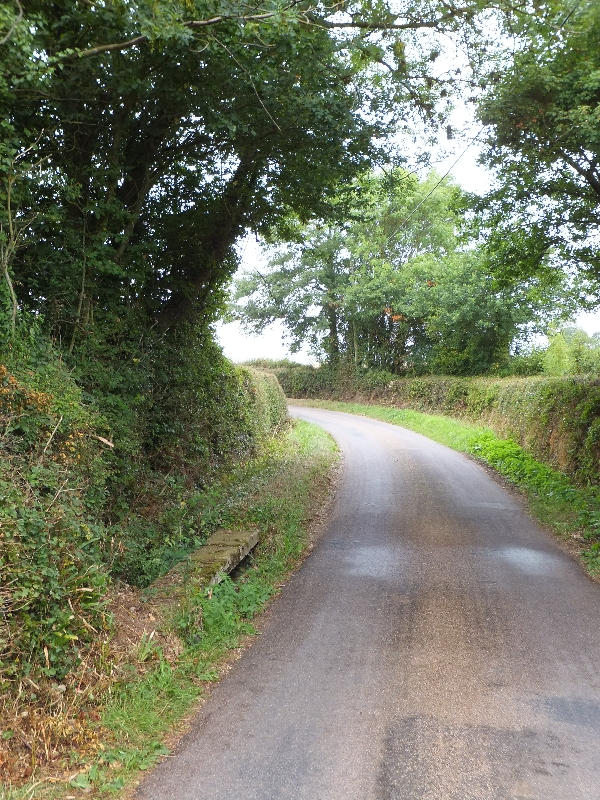
Spain Lane

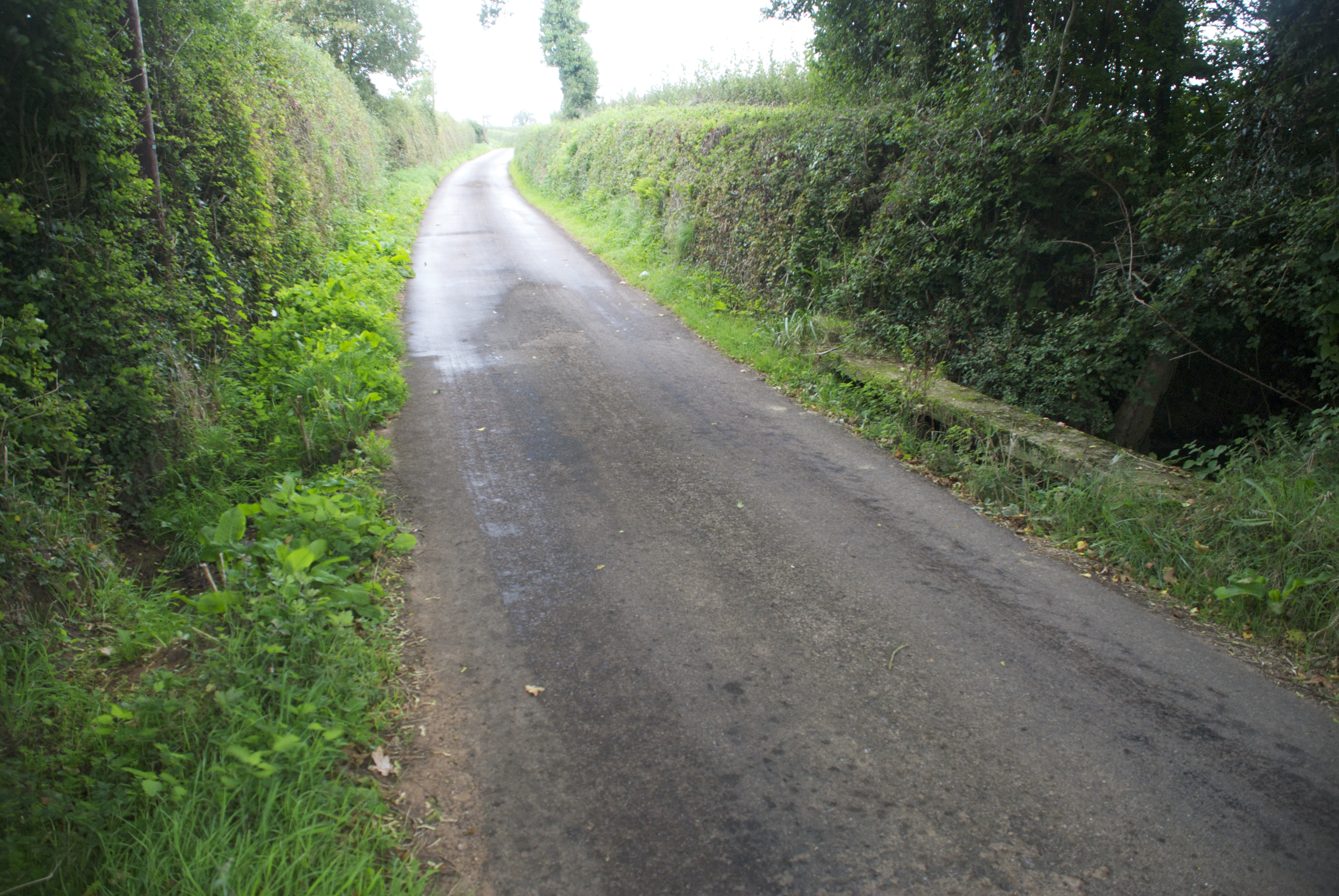
Spain Lane

=== Hill Barton ===
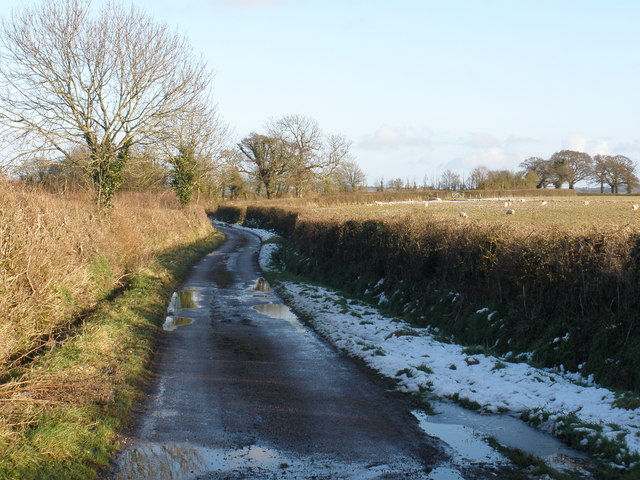
Minor road near Clyst St Mary

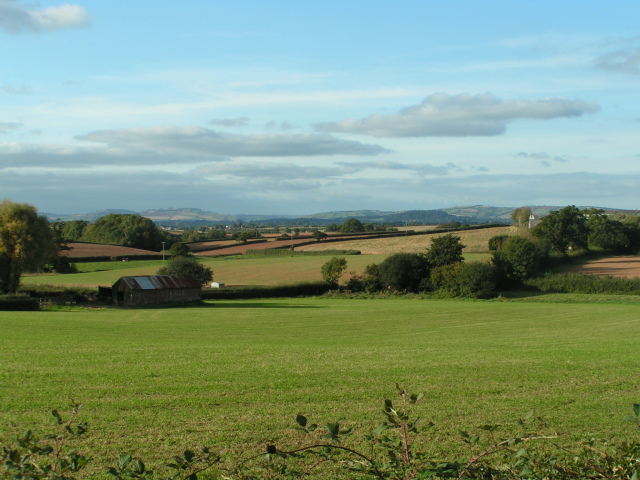
Fields near Hill Barton Farm

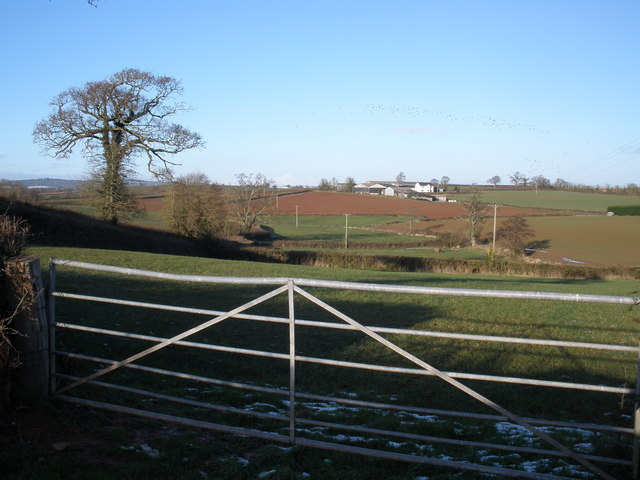
View towards New House Farm

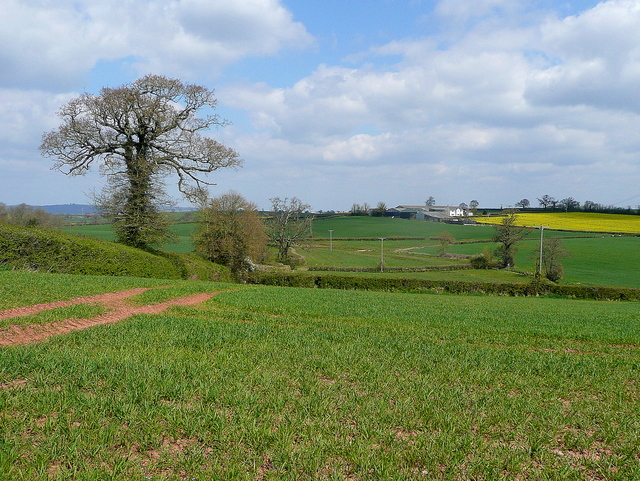
Farmland near Clyst Honiton

=== Holbrook Bridge ===
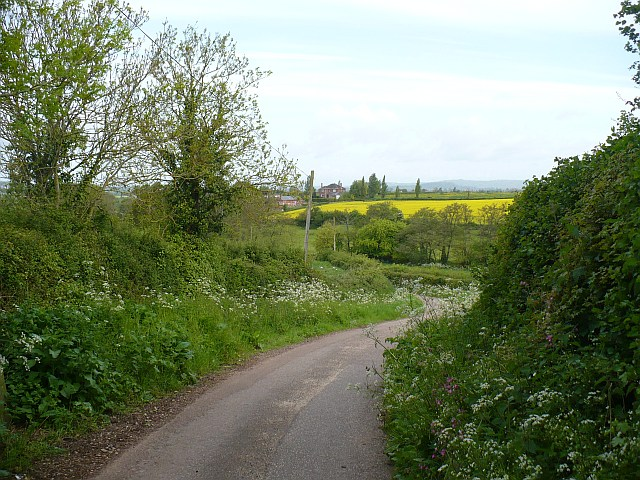
Lane near Holbrook Bridge

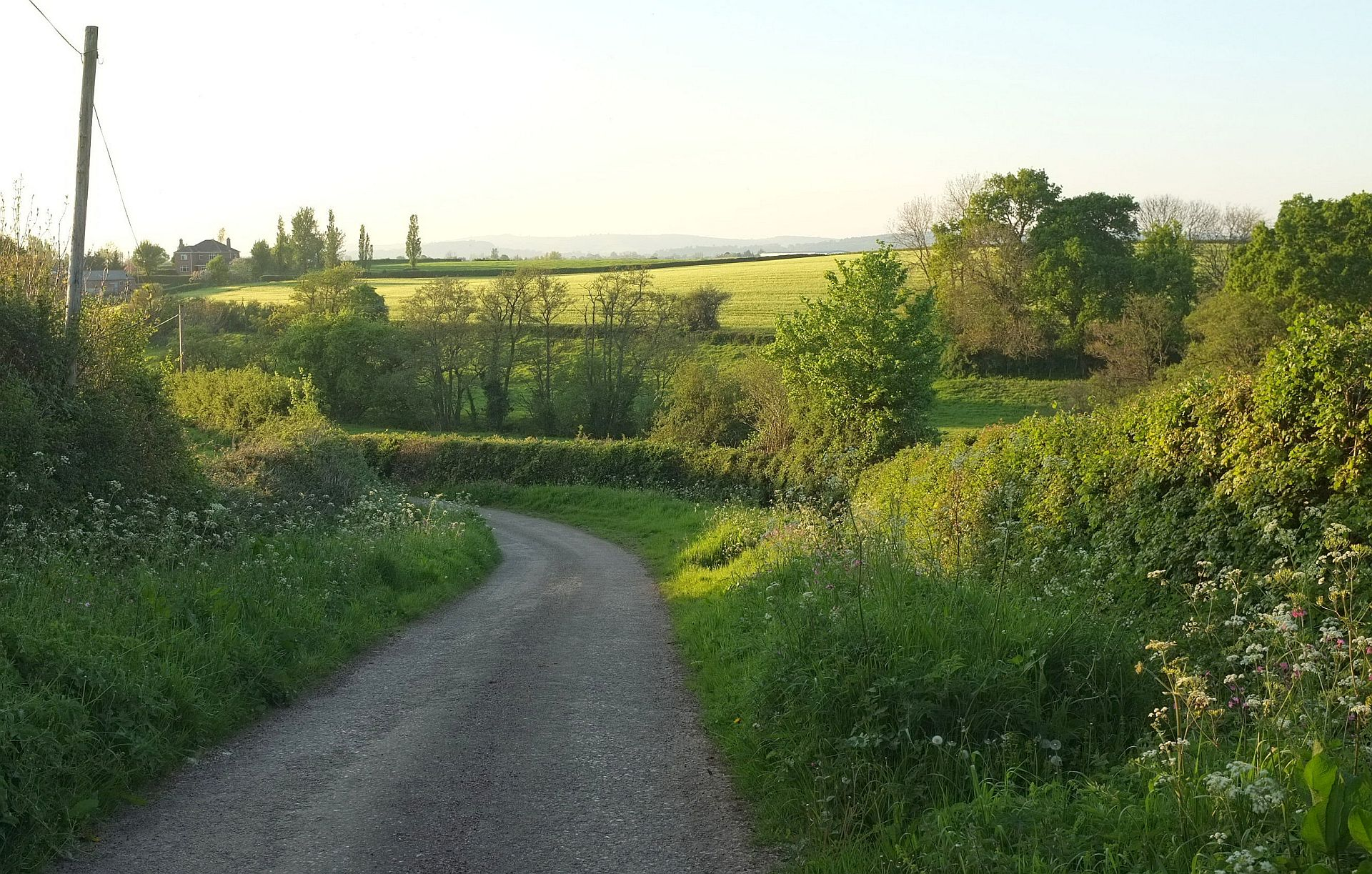
Valley of the Holbrook

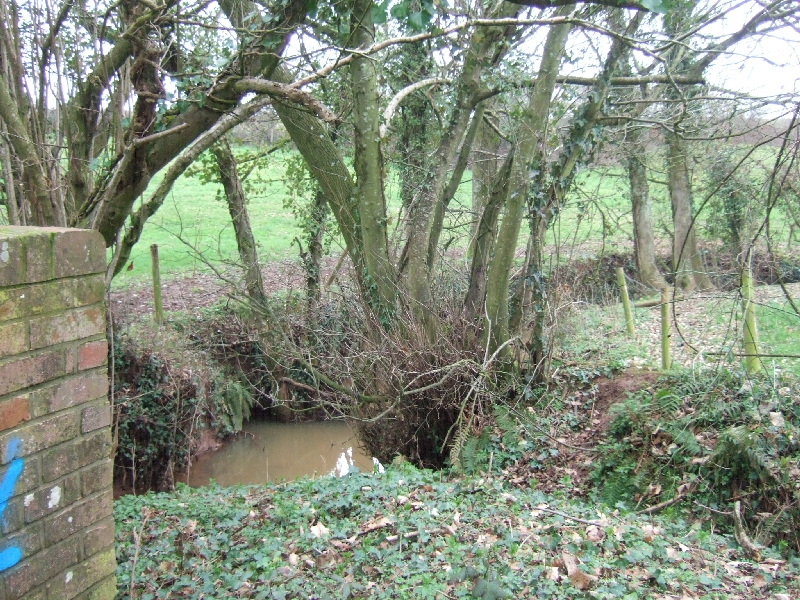
Stream at Holbrook Bridge

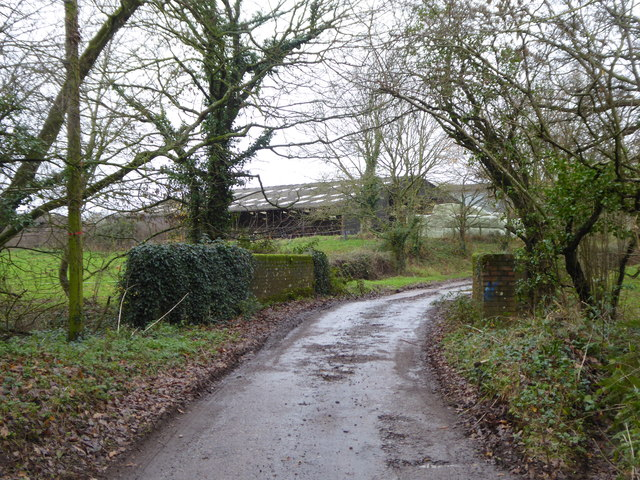
Holbrook Bridge

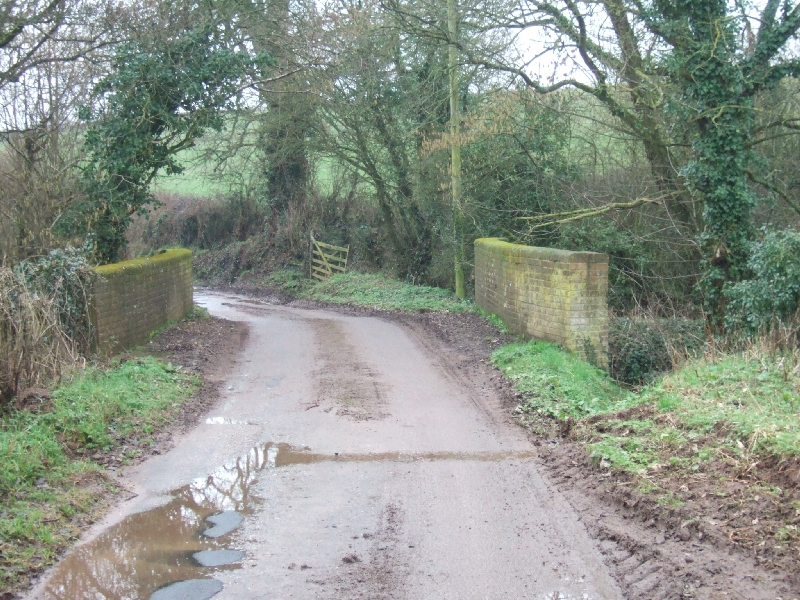
Holbrook Bridge

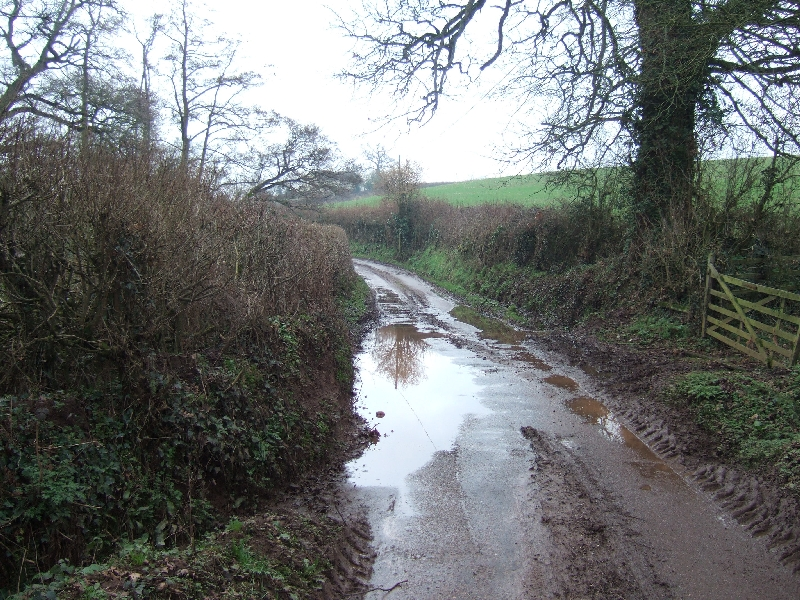
Lane at Holbrook Bridge

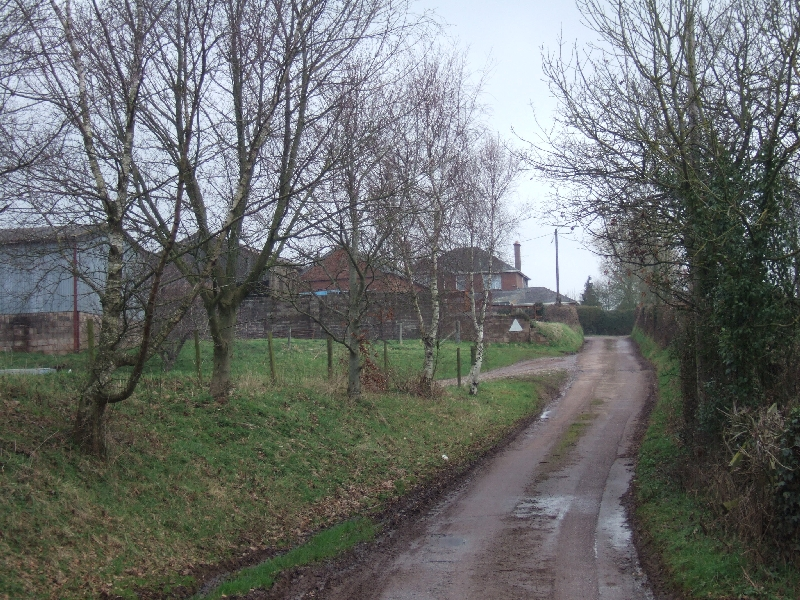
Wroford Manor and farm buildings

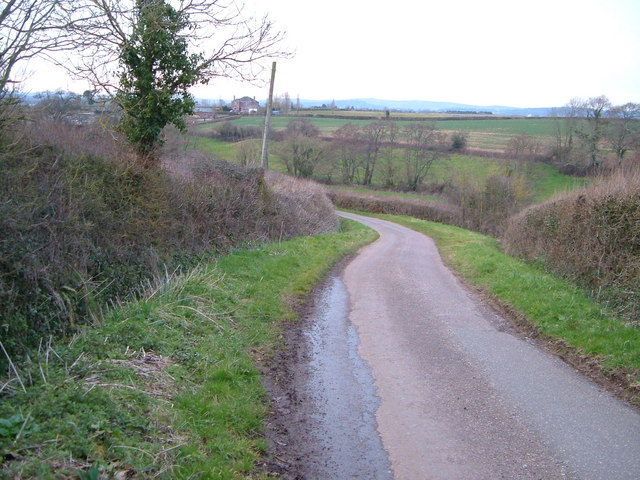
Lane to Holbrook Bridge

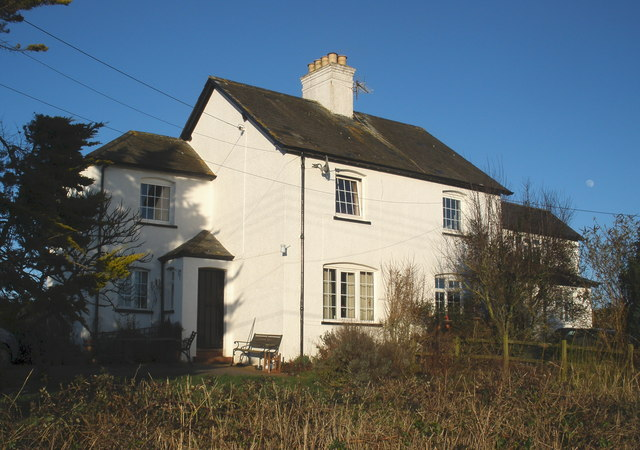
Cottage near Holbrook Bridge

=== Holbrook Farm ===
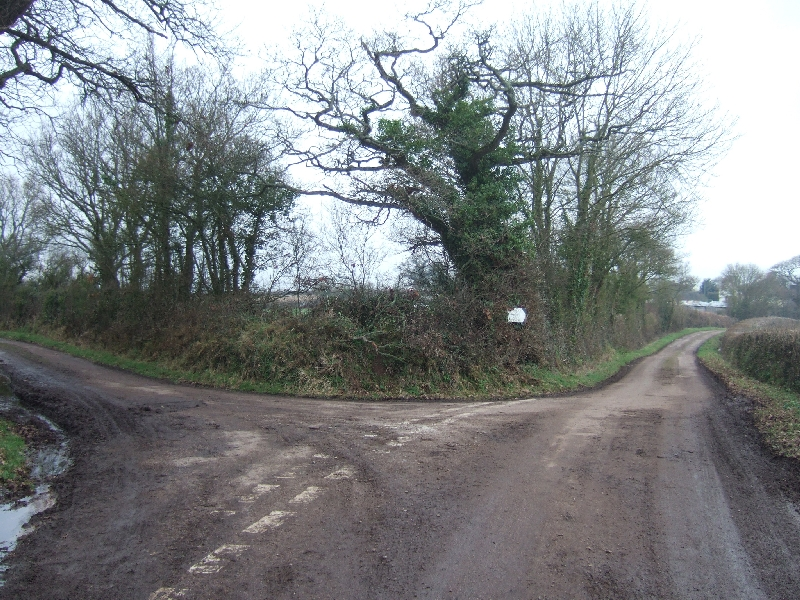
Road junction near Holbrook Farm

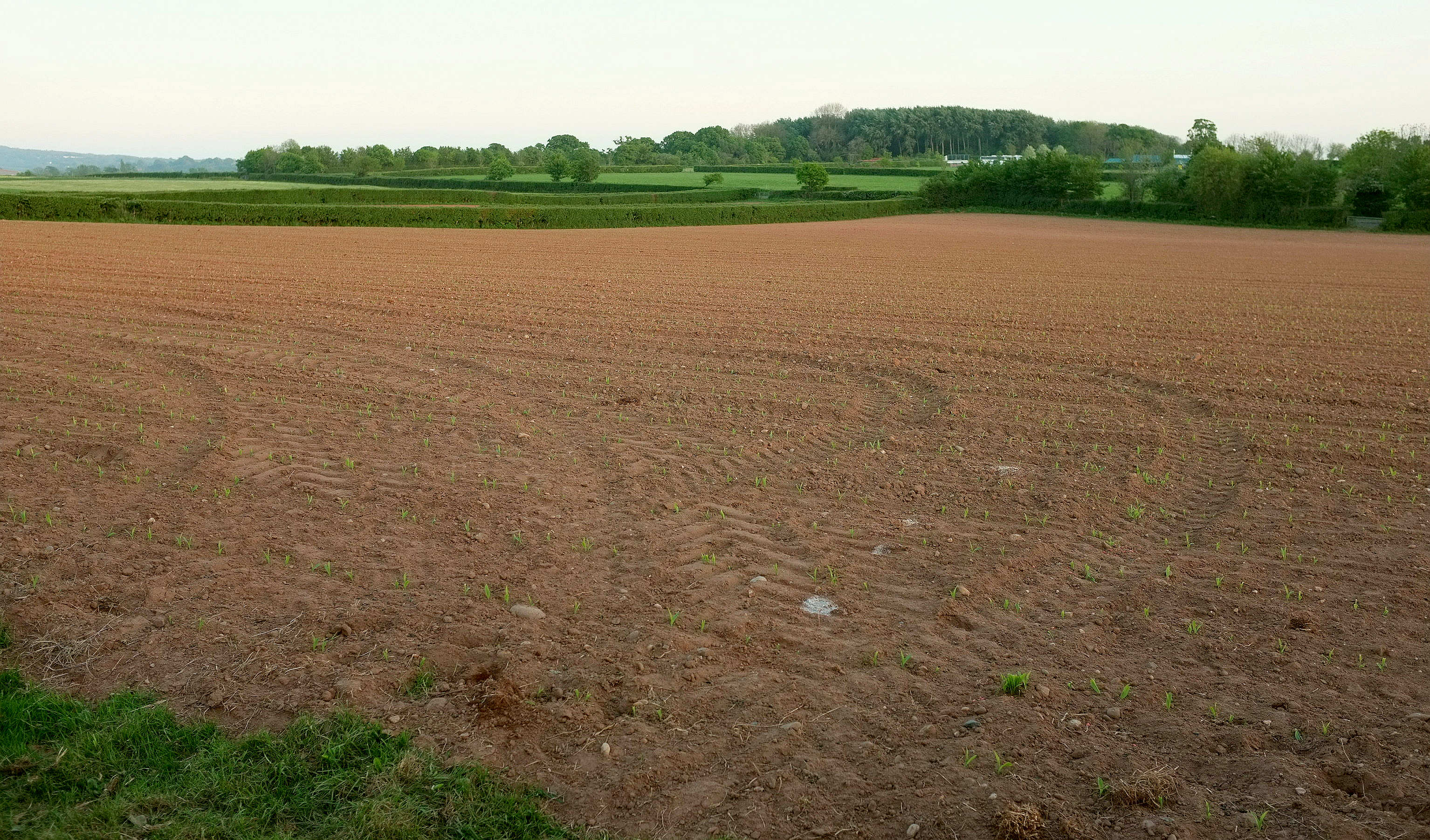
Arable field near Westpoint

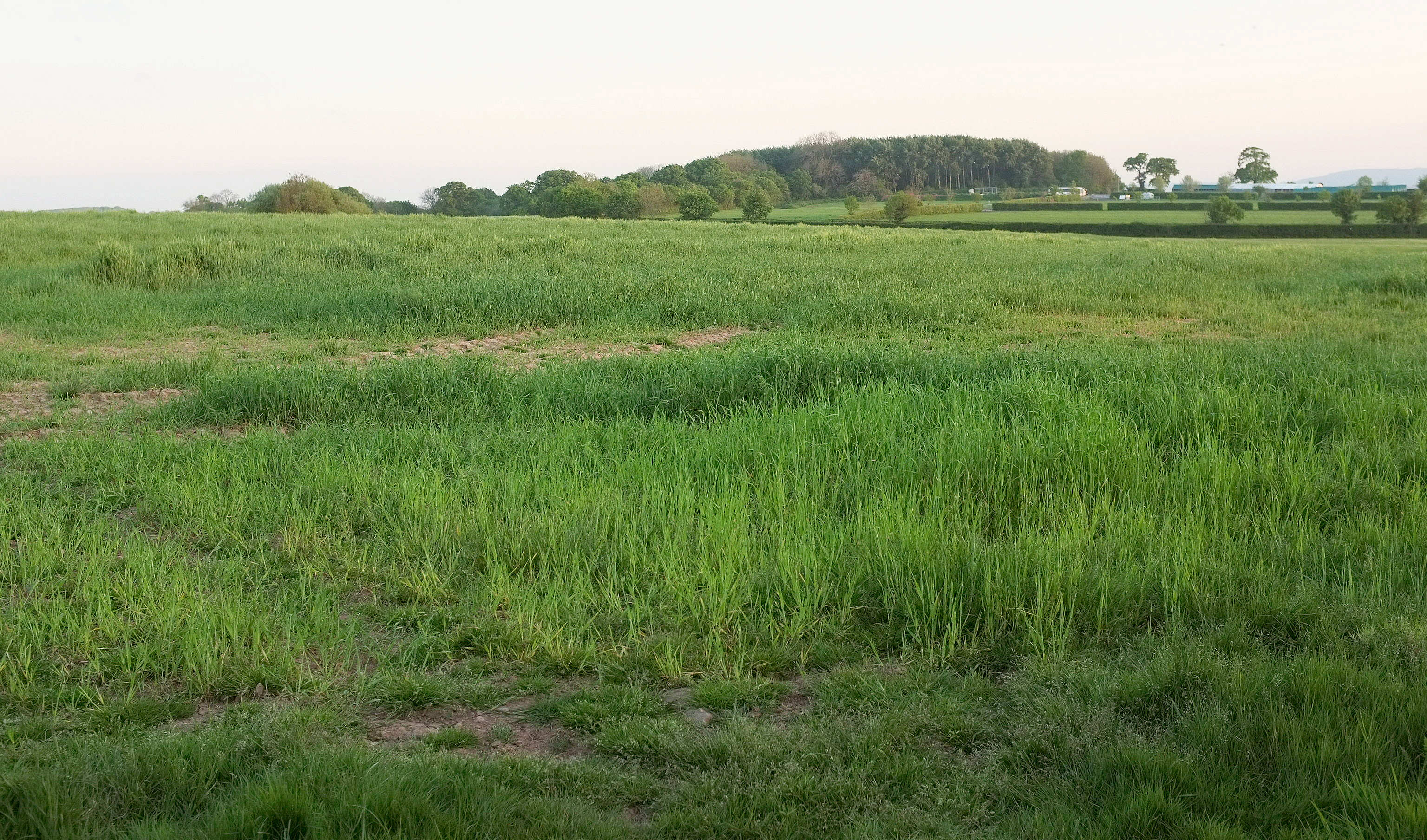
Field near Holbrook Farm

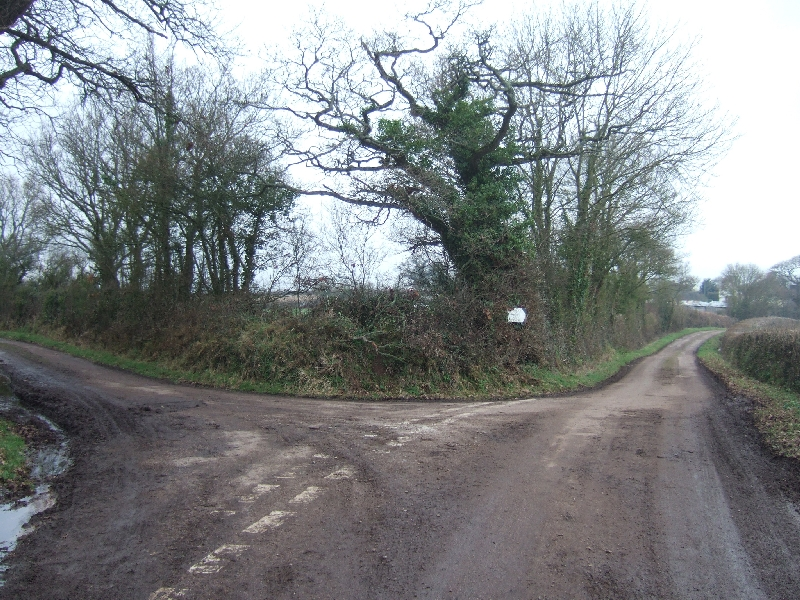
Road junction near Holbrook Farm

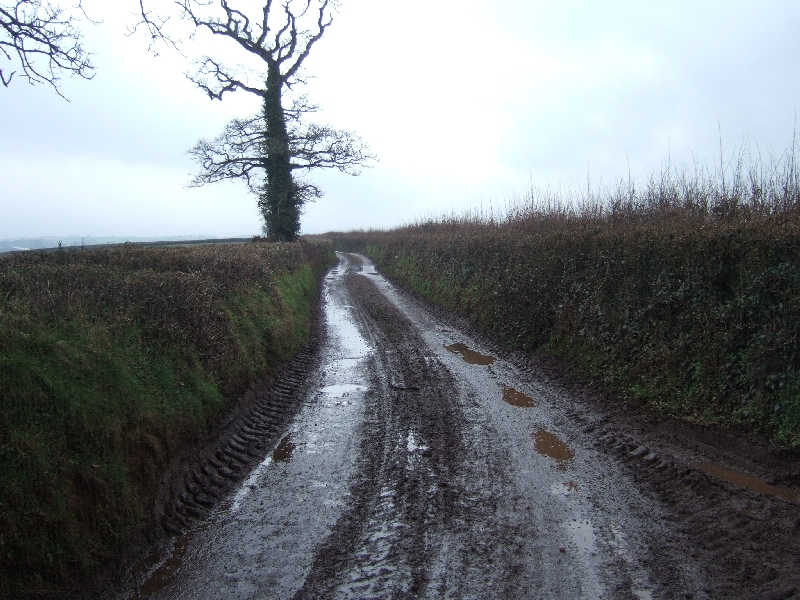
Muddy road near Holbrook Farm

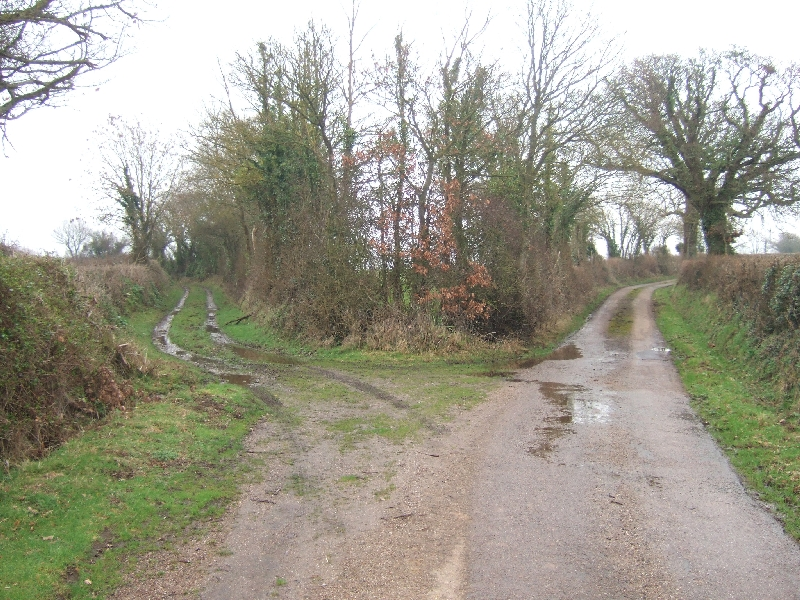
Green lane near Holbrook Farm

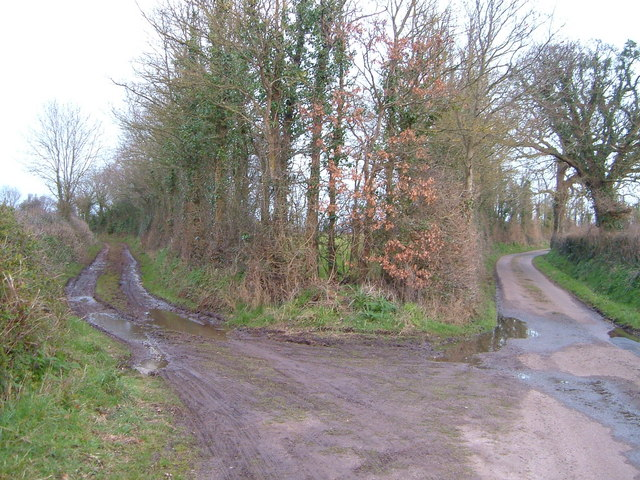
Lane junction near Westpoint

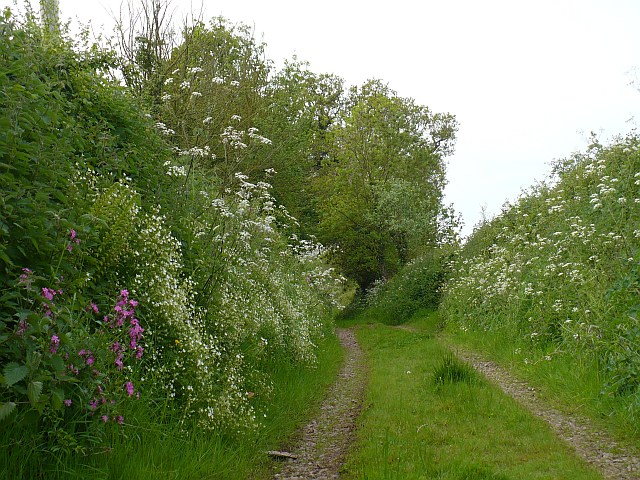
Green lane near Holbrook Farm

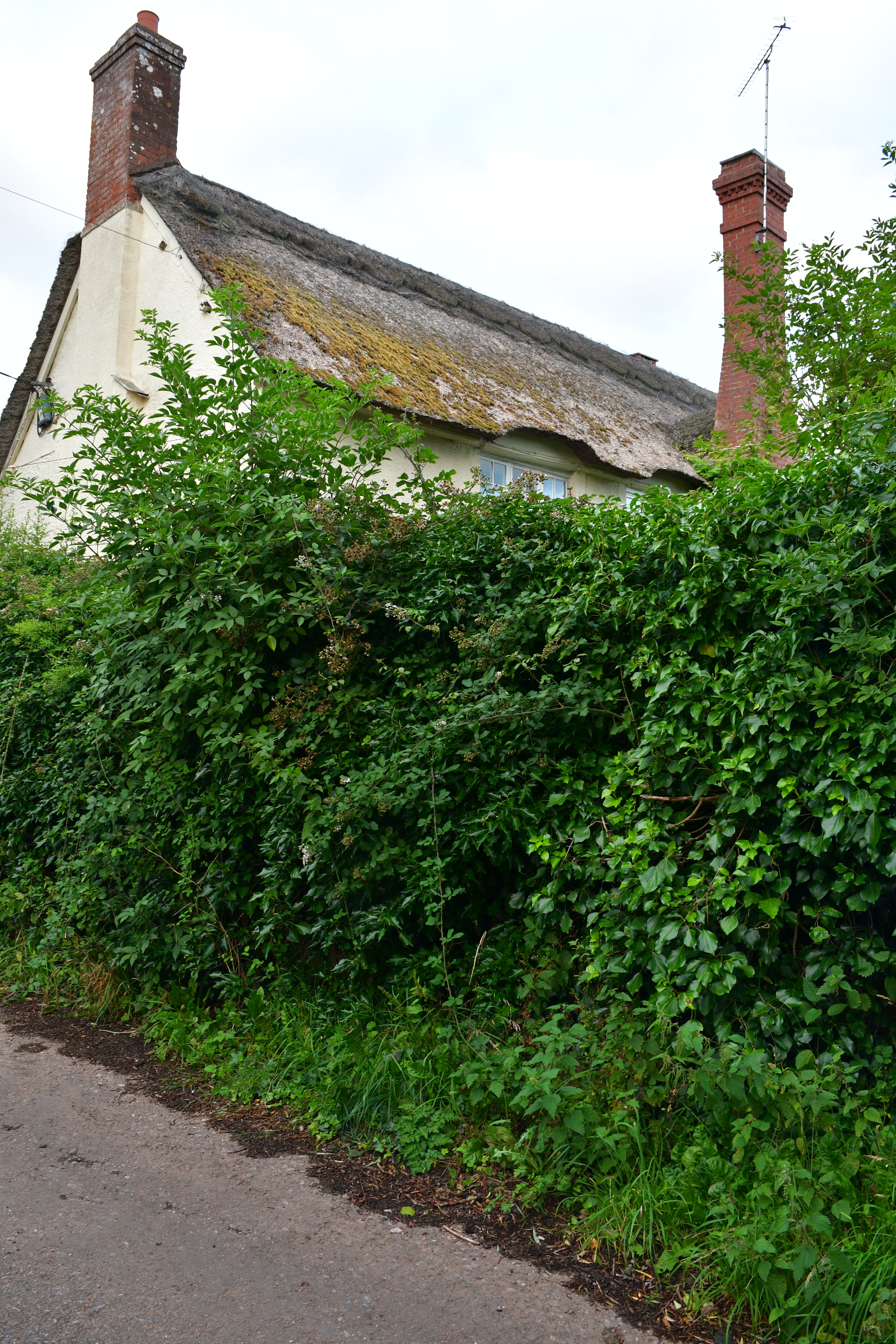
Higher Holbrook

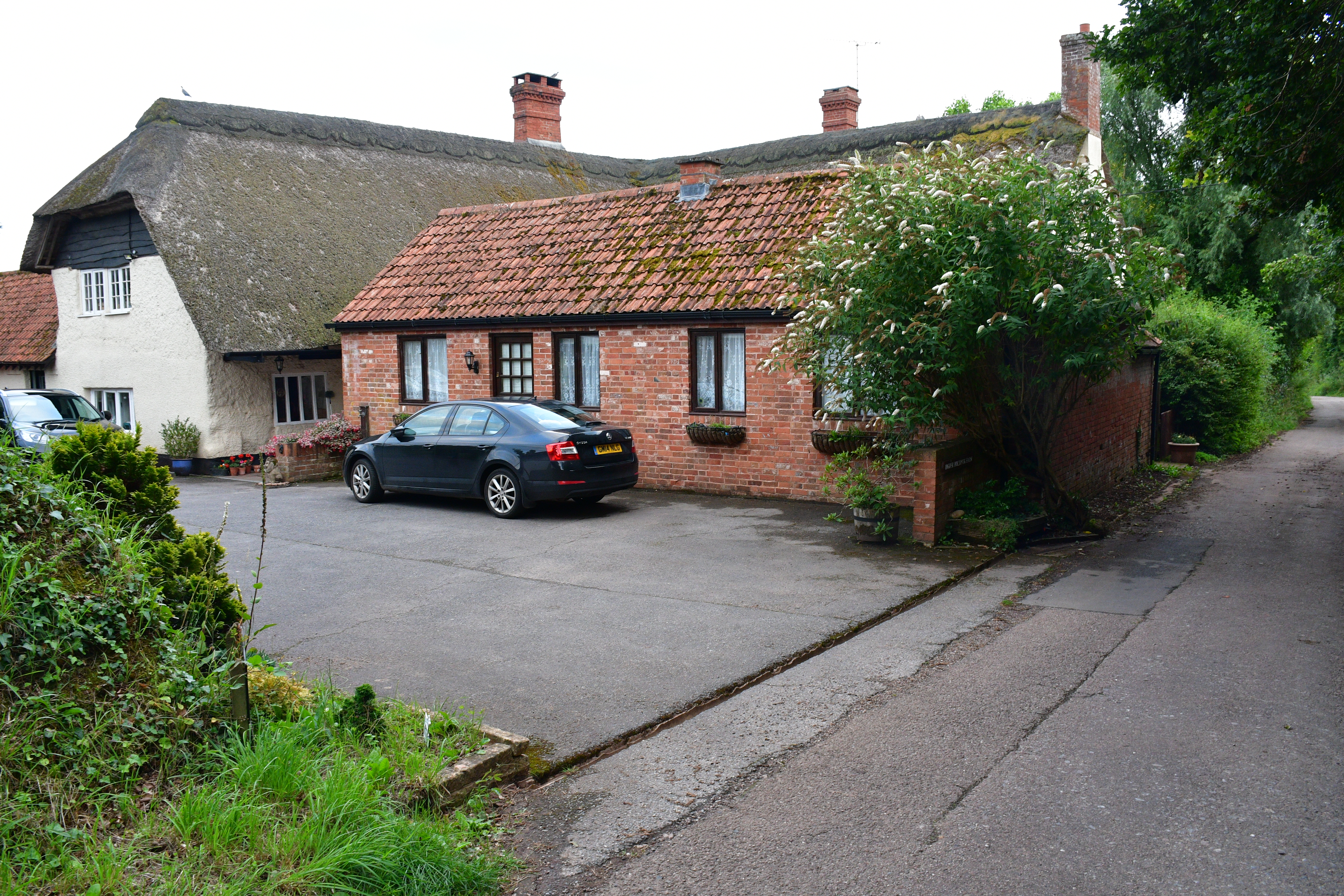
Higher Holbrook

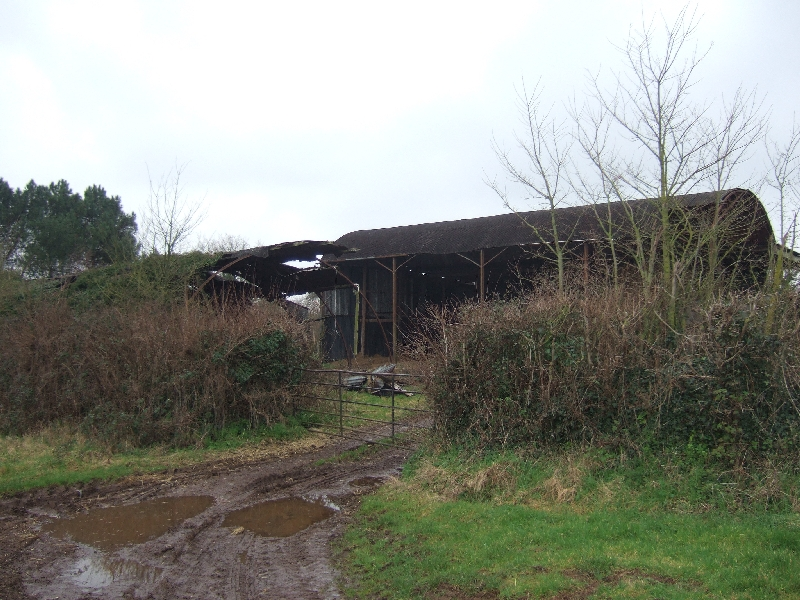
Barns at Holbrook Farm

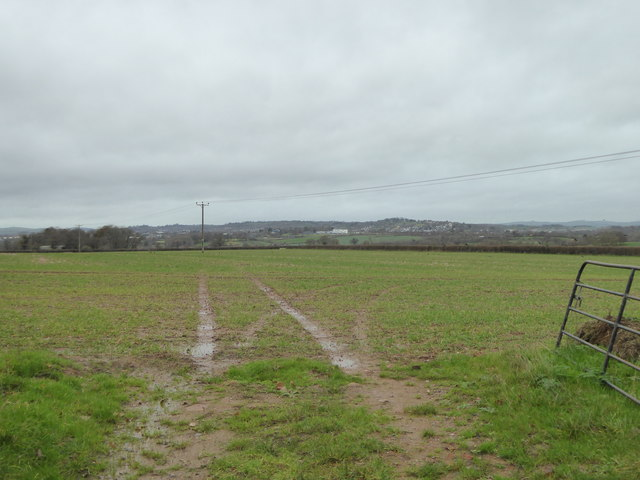
Field near Holbrook Farm

=== Marlborough Farm ===
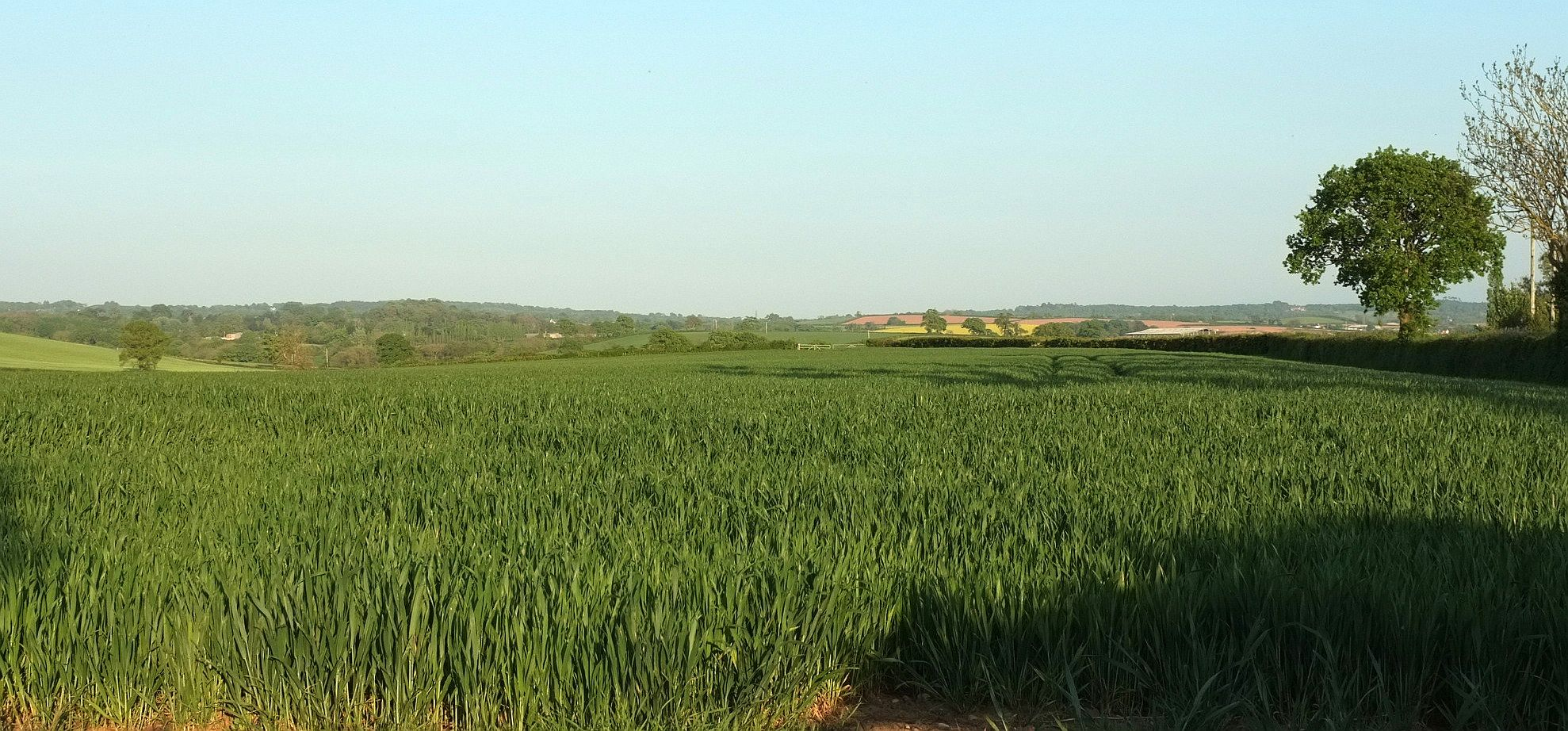
Field by Marlborough Farm

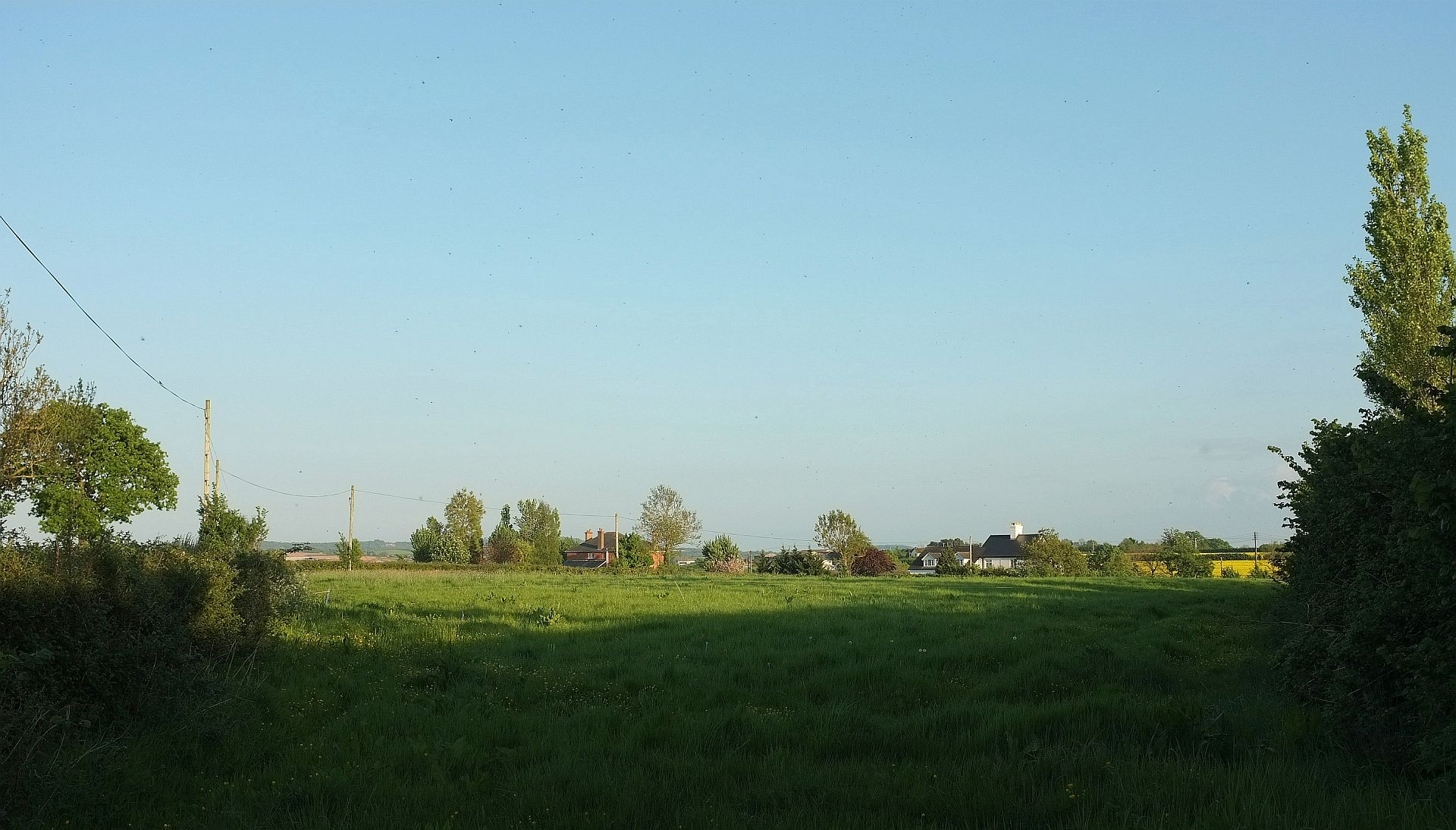
Field by Marlborough Farm

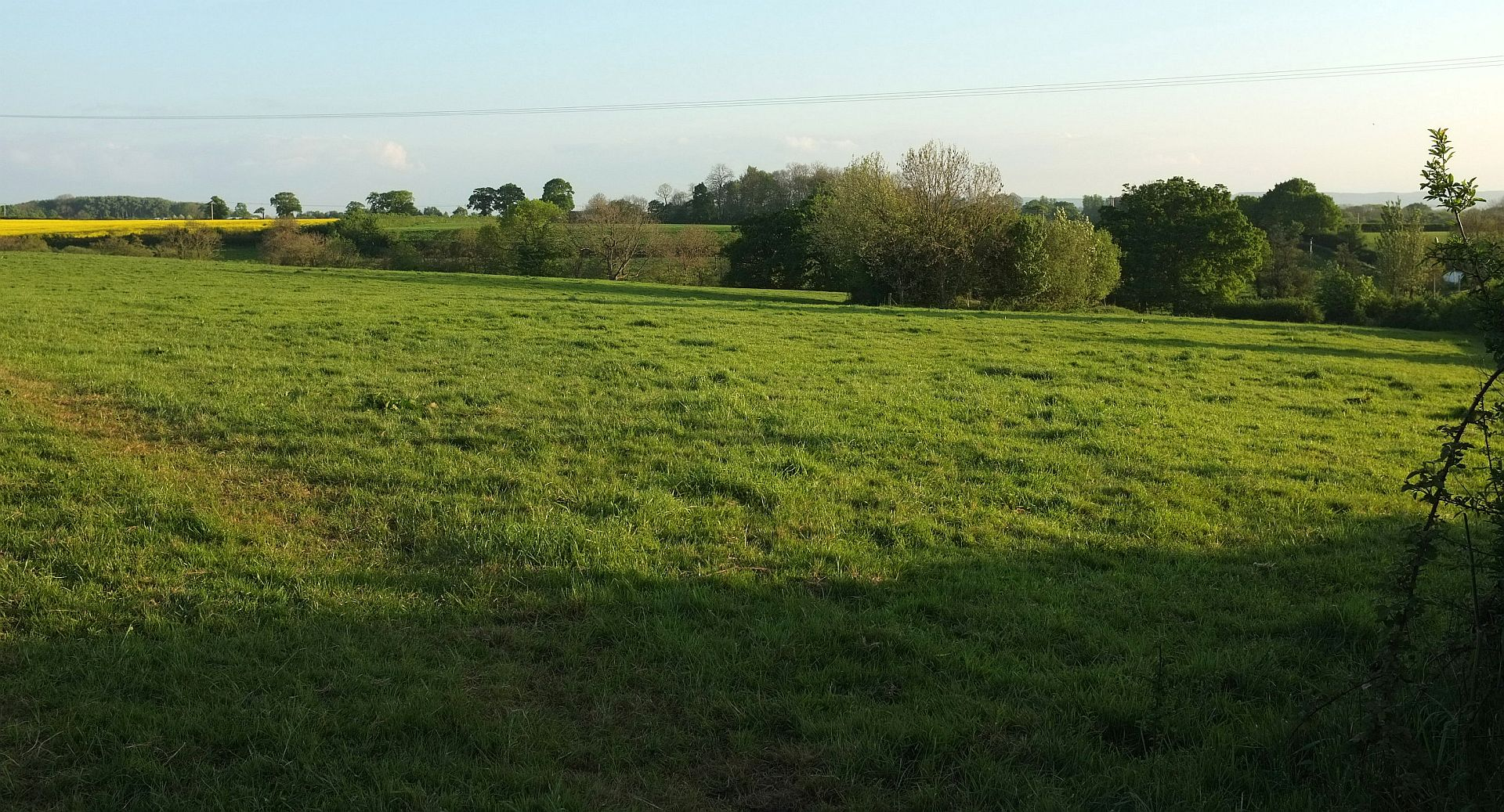
Field by Marlborough Farm

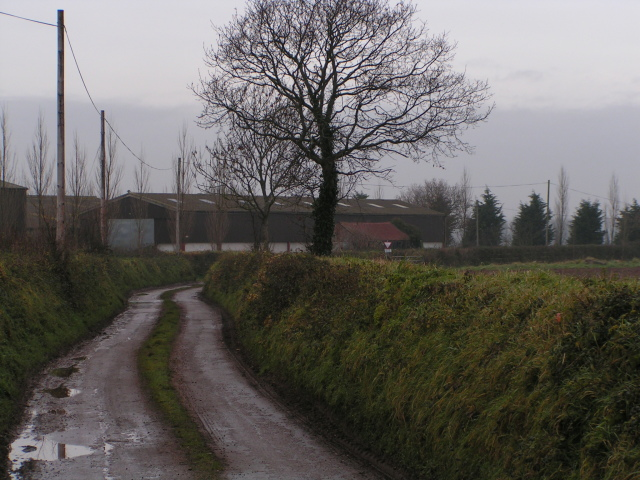
Lane and Marlborough Farm building, near Clyst Honiton

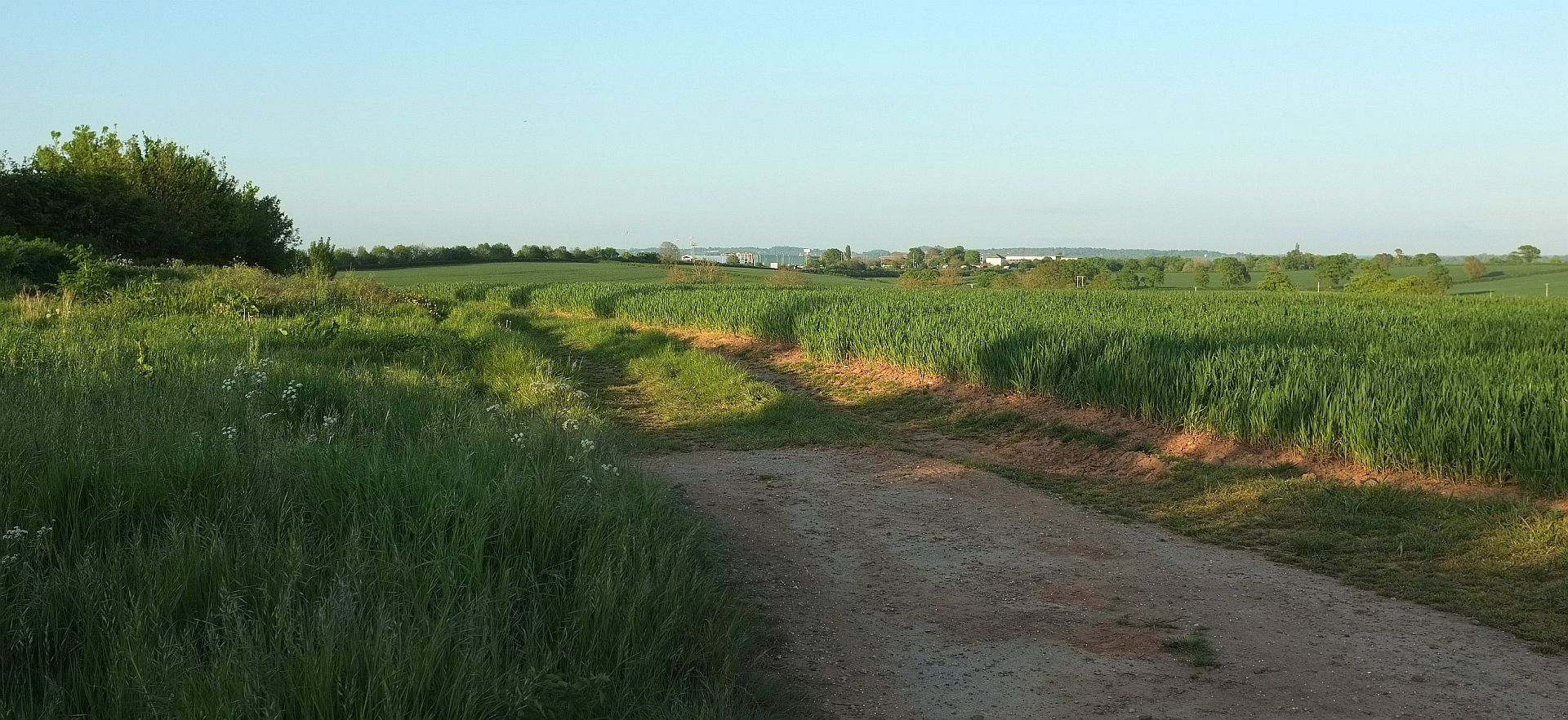
Field by Marlborough Farm

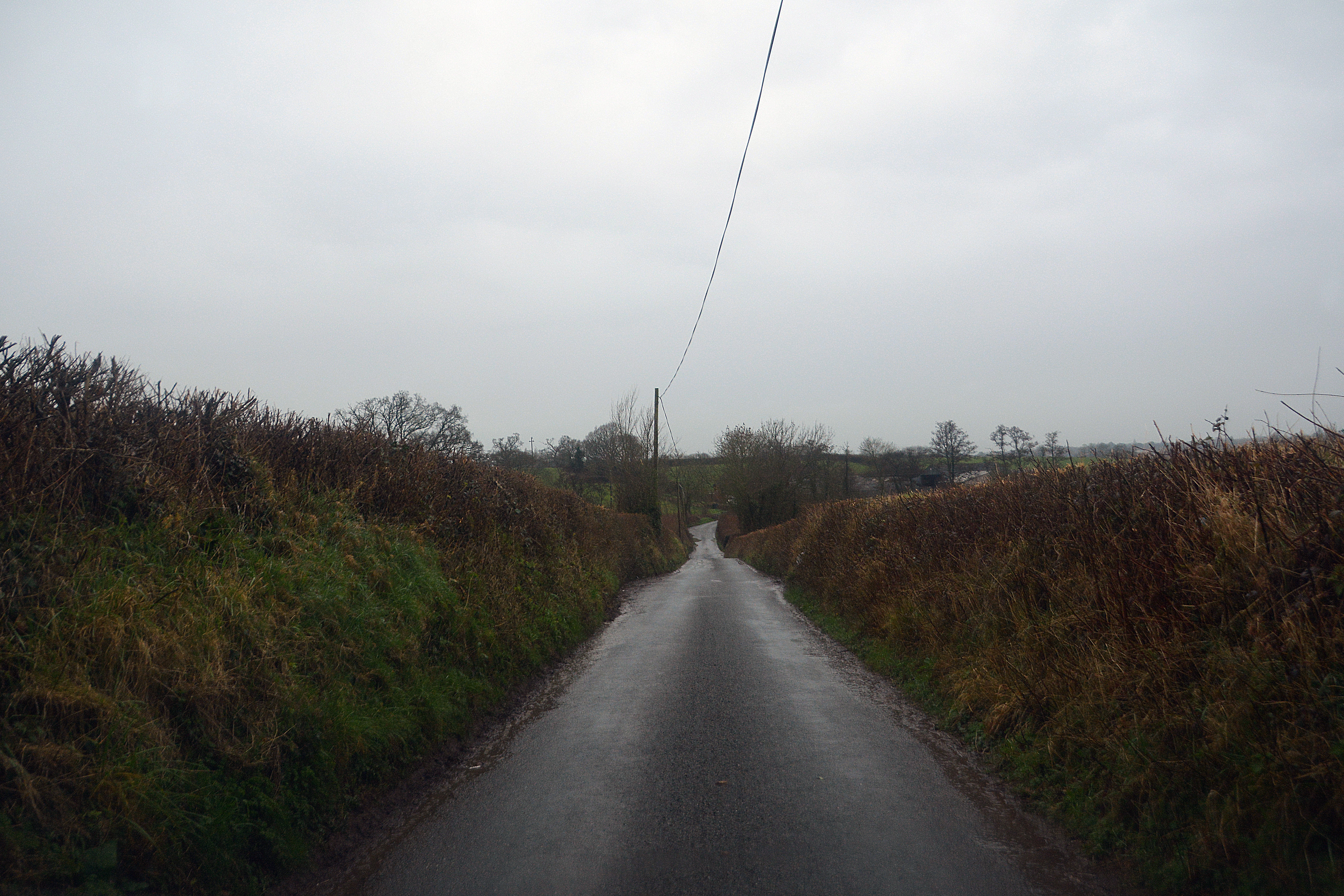
Bishop's Court Lane near Marlborough Farm

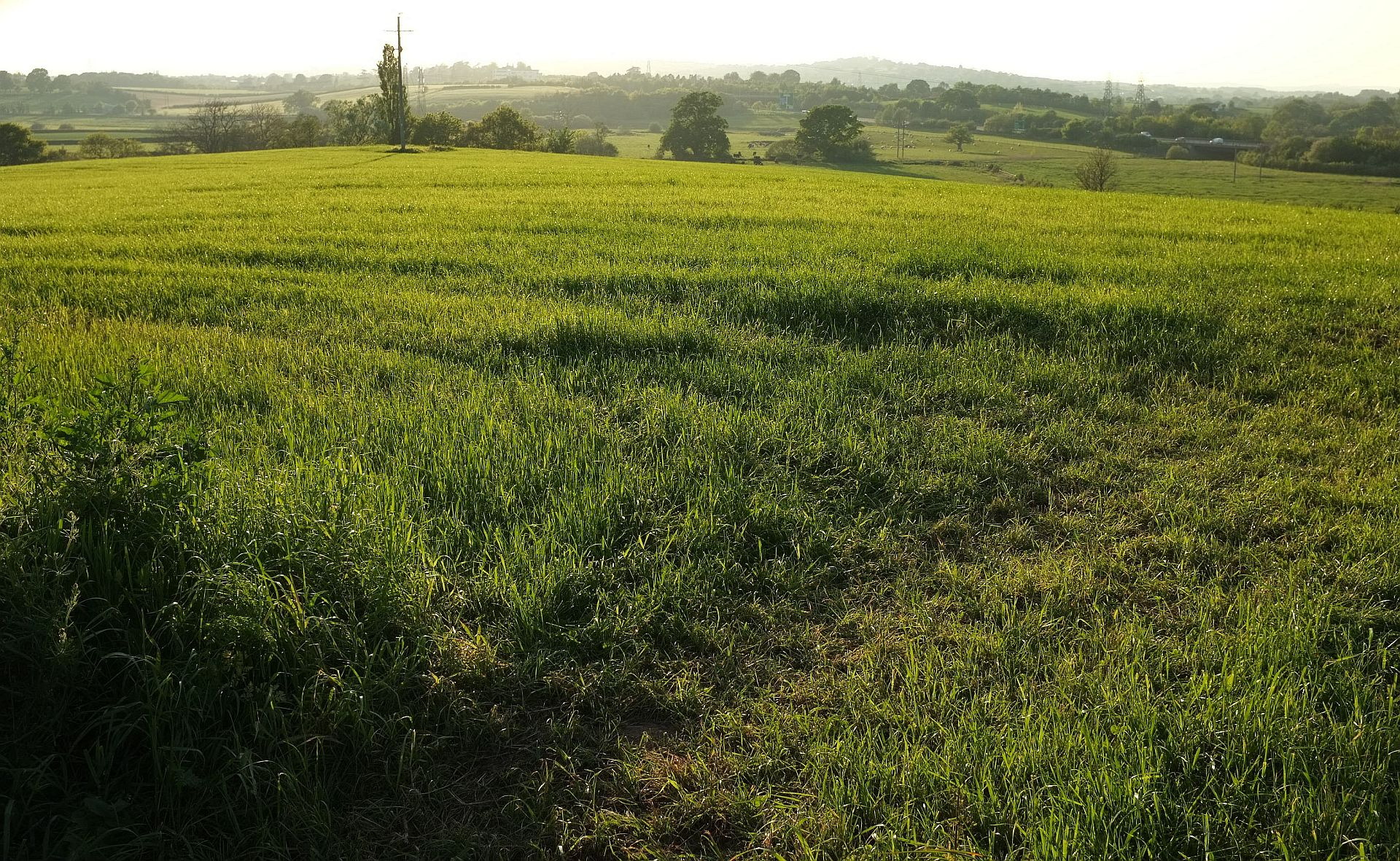
Field by Marlborough Farm

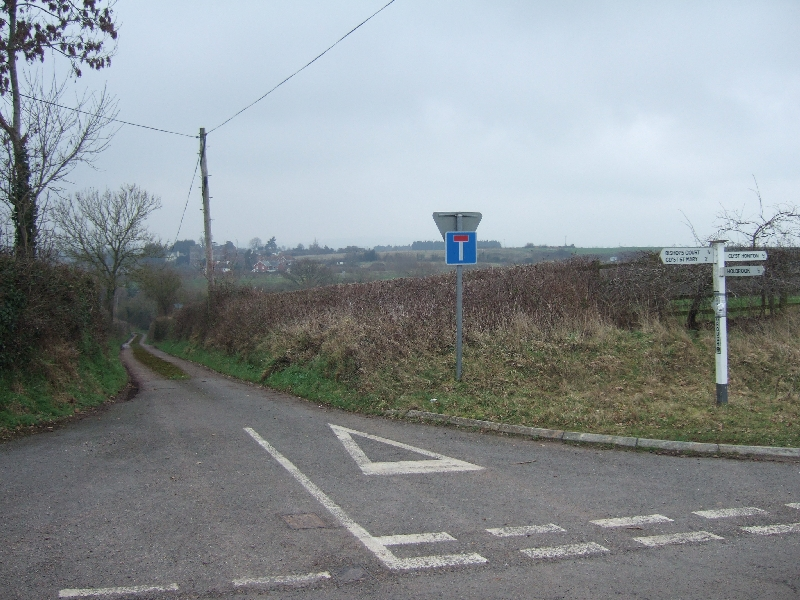
Marlborough Cross

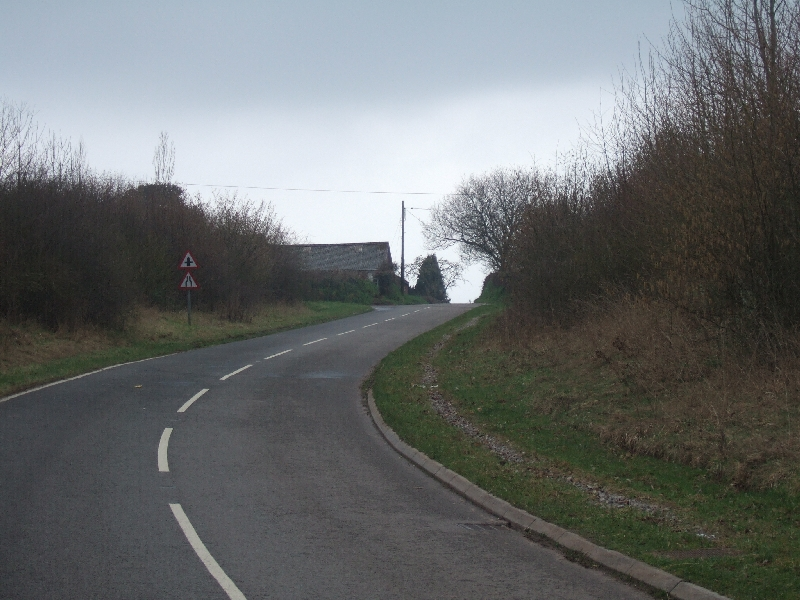
Road to Marlborough

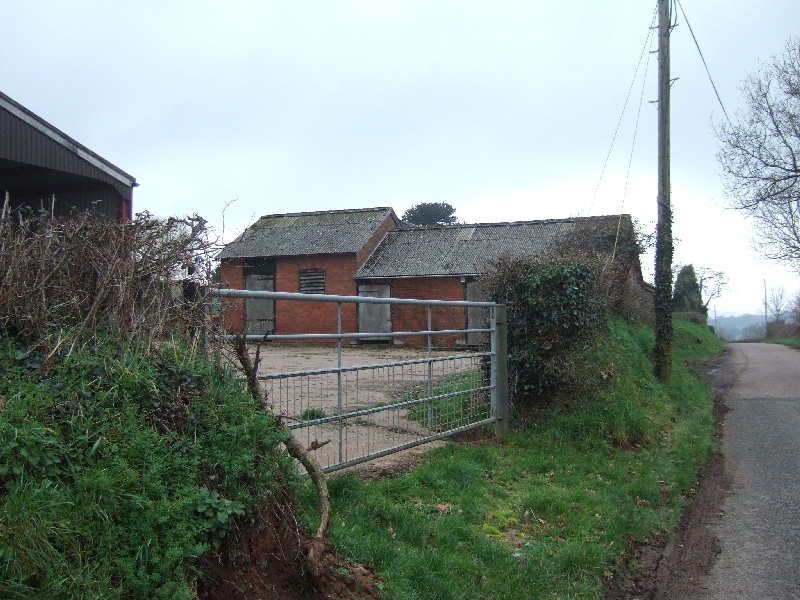
Outbuildings of Marlborough Farm

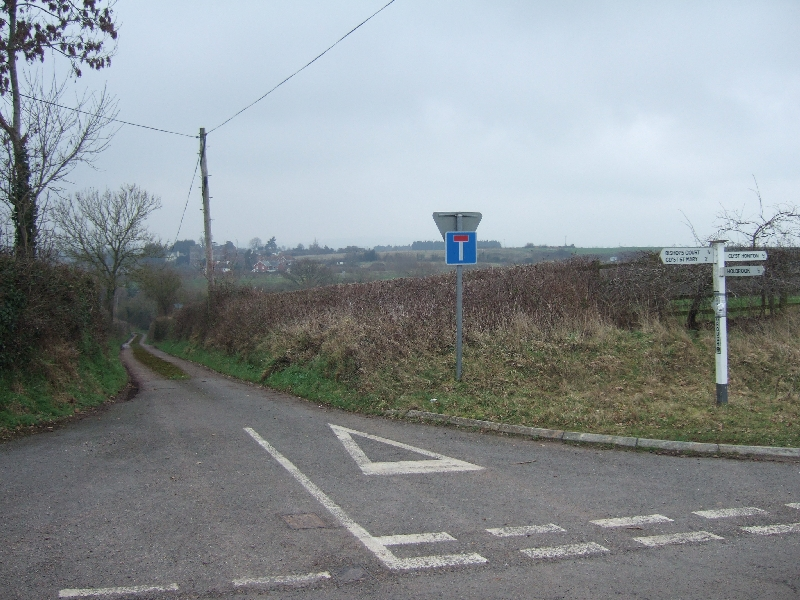
Marlborough Cross

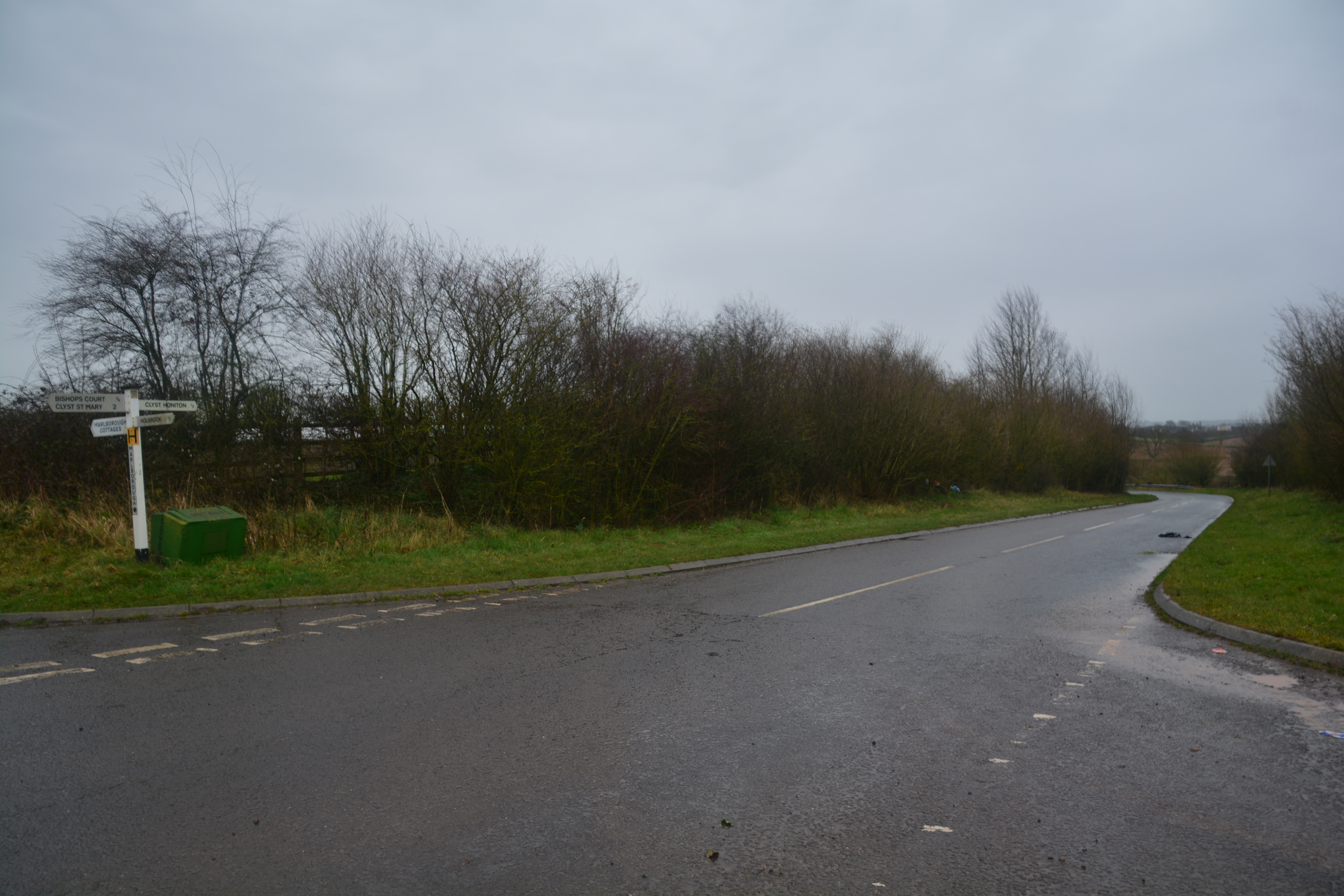
Junction at Marlborough Cross

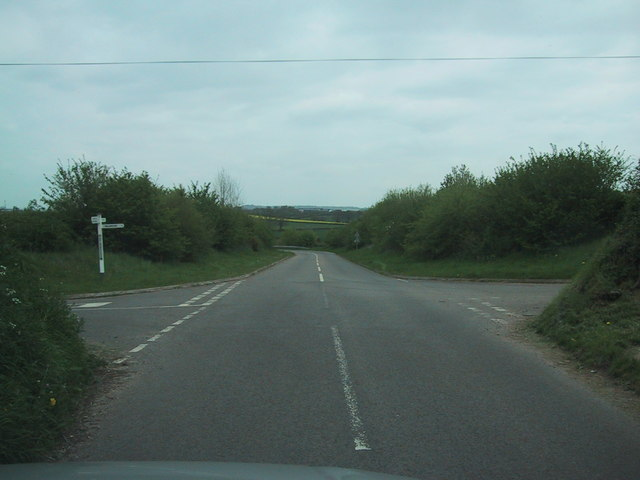
Junction at Marlborough Cross

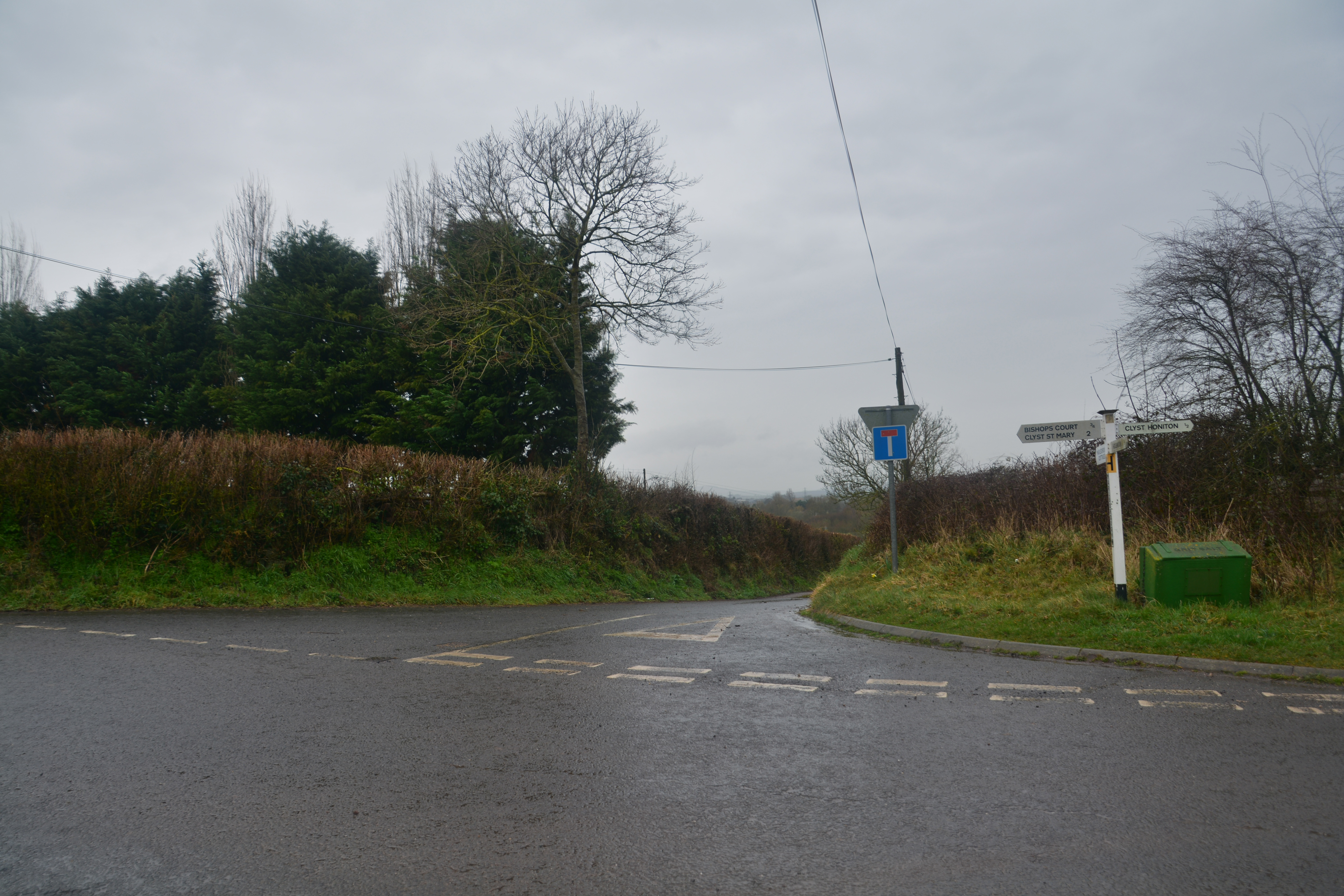
Junction at Marlborough Cross

=== Spain Farm ===
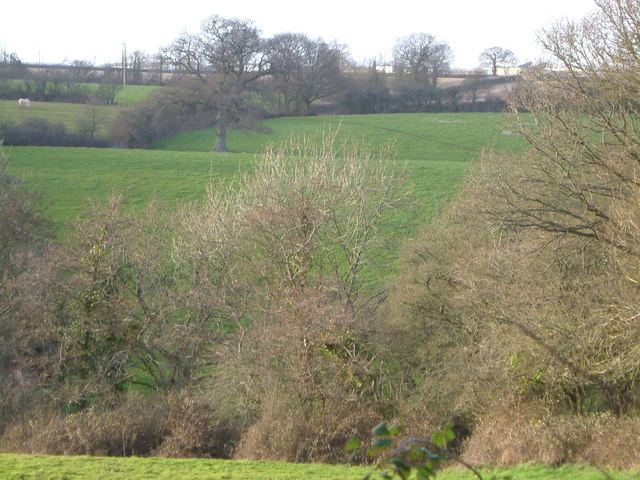
Near Spain Farm

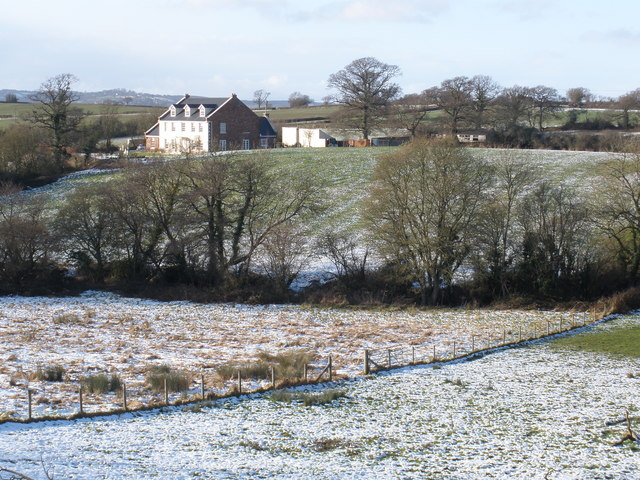
Spain Farm

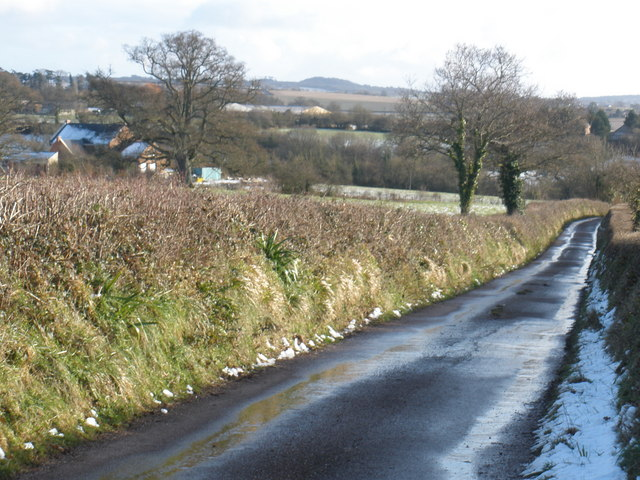
Minor road to Farringdon Cross

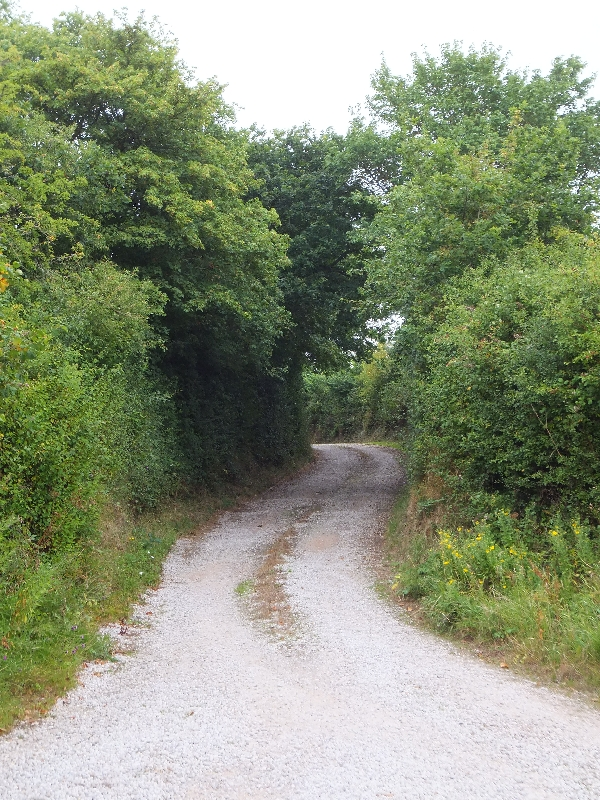
Track to Spain Farm

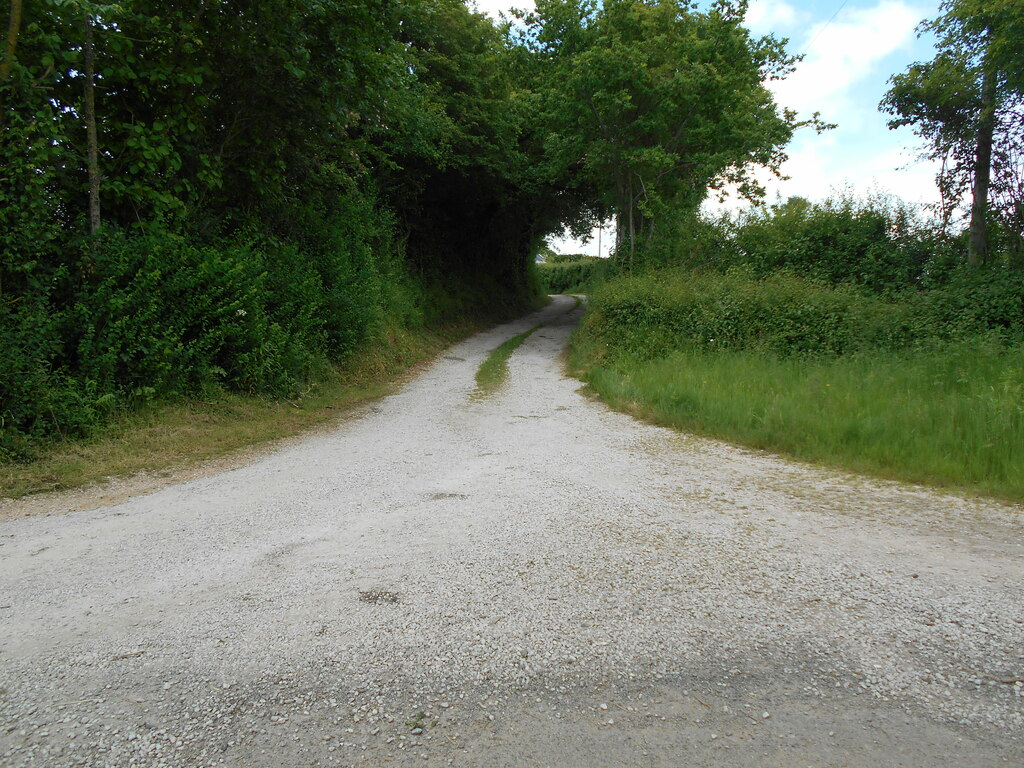
Track to Spain Farm

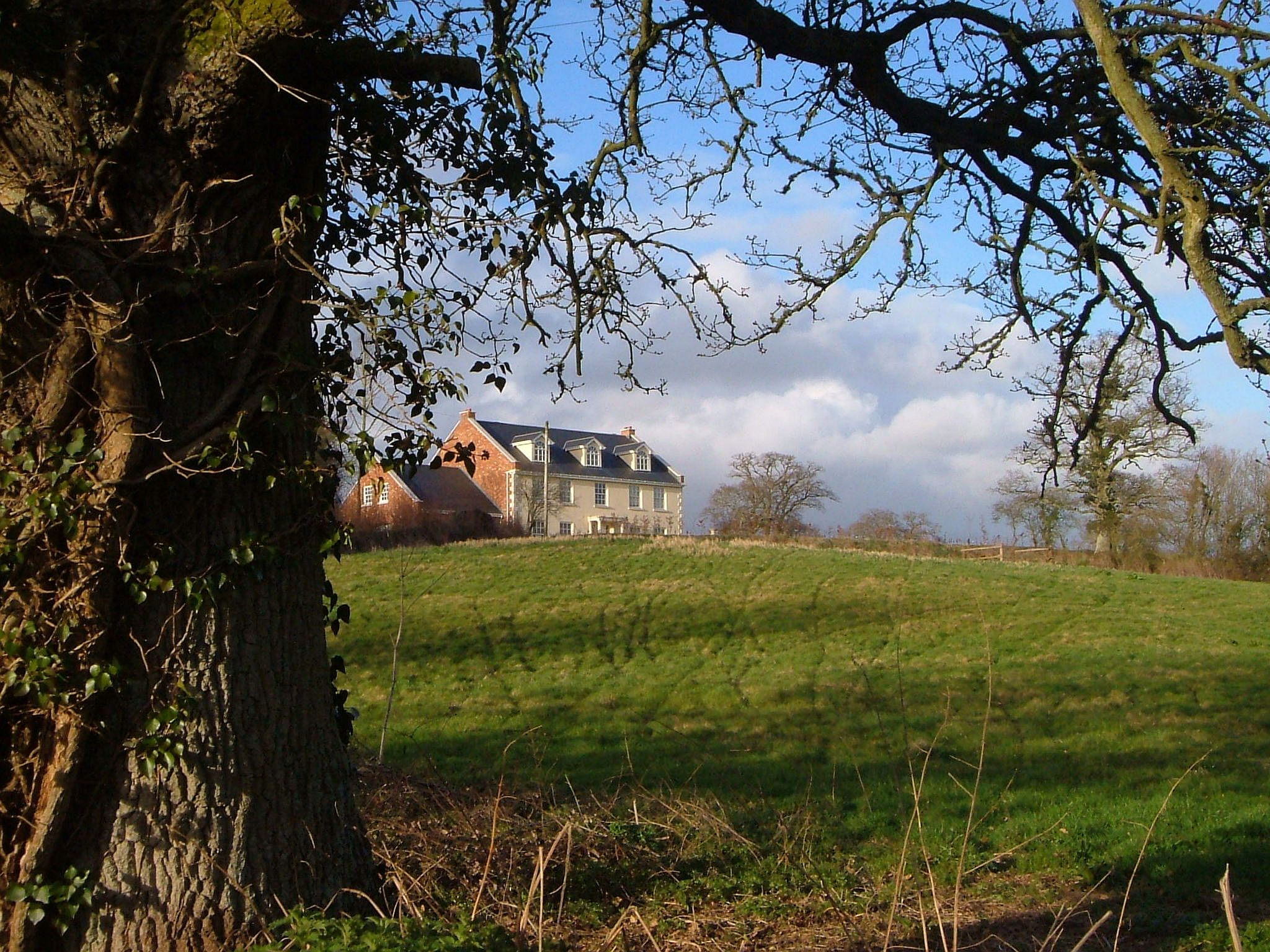
Spain Farm

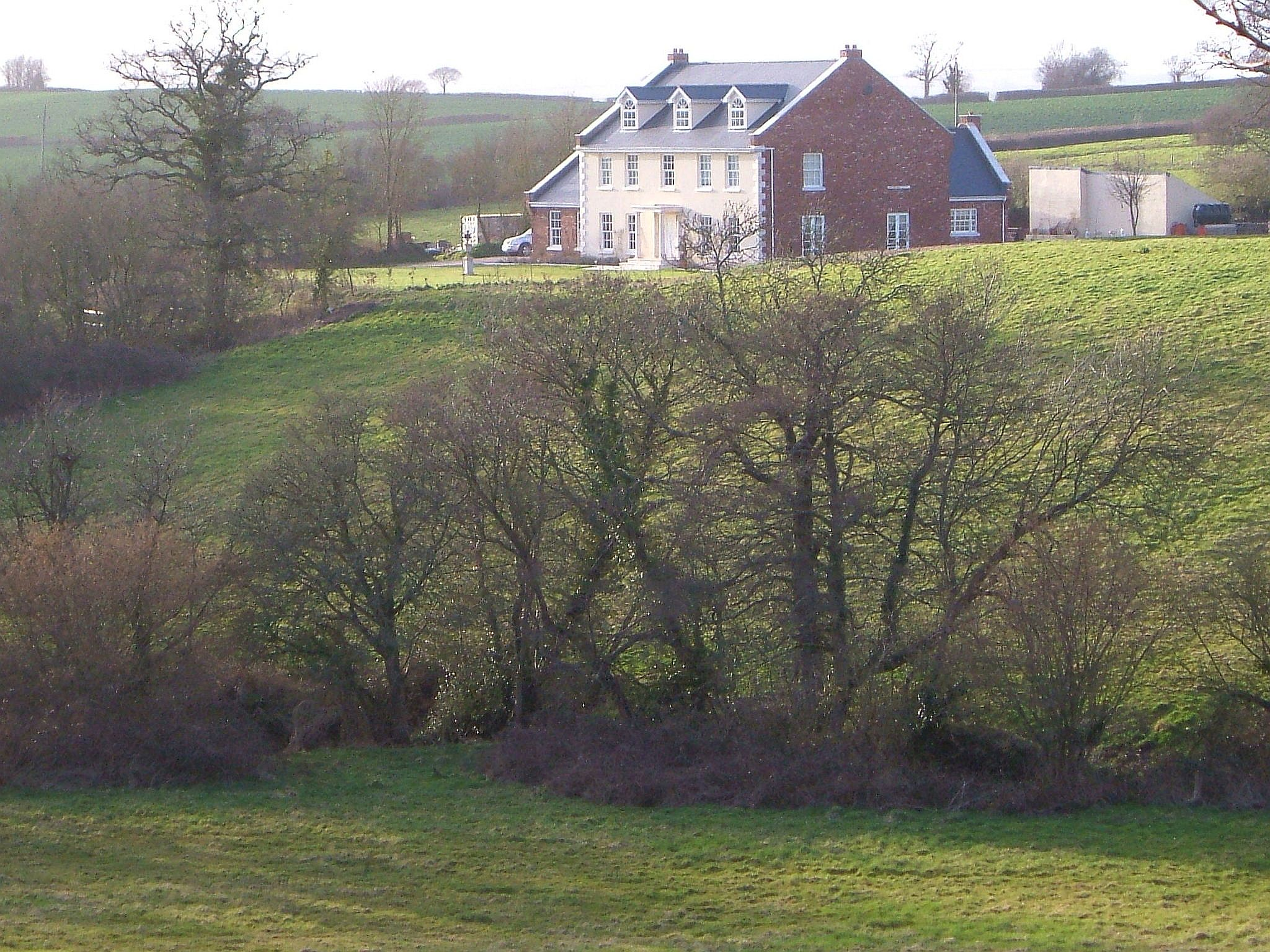
Spain Farm

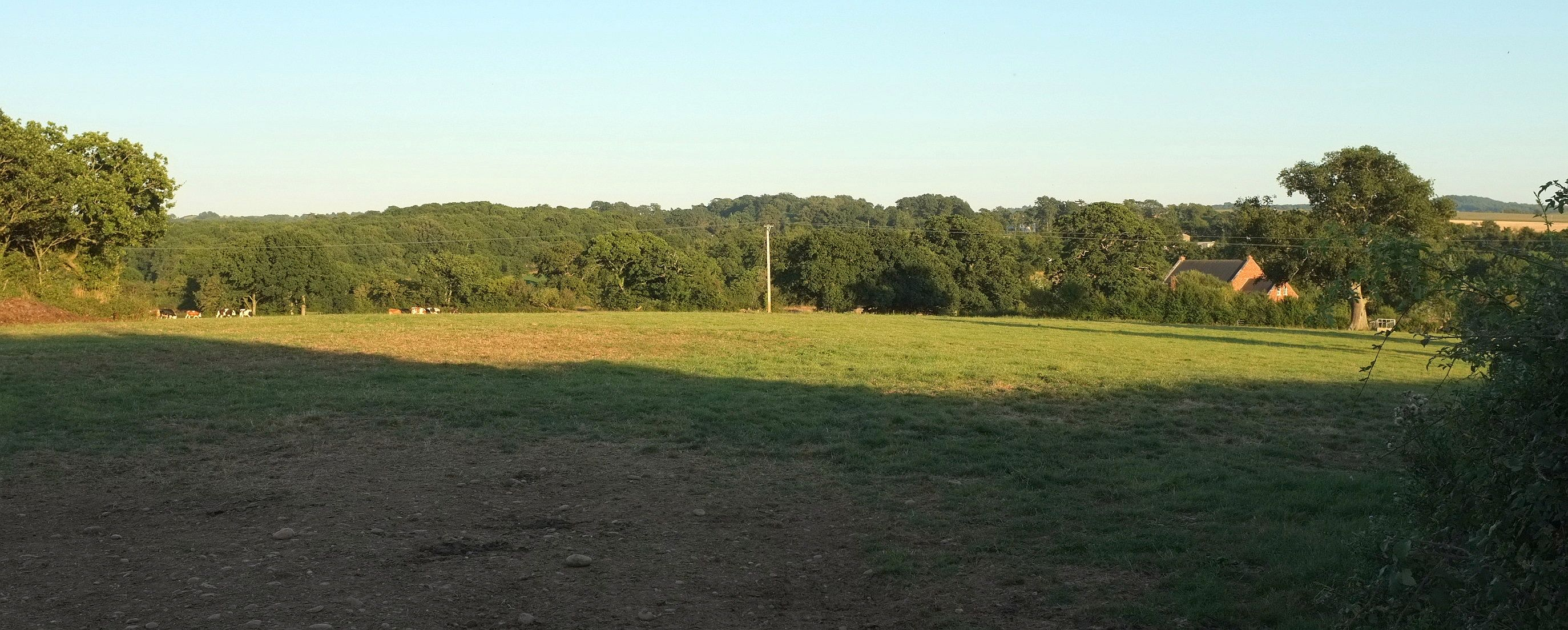
Field near Spain Farm

=== South of the A30 ===
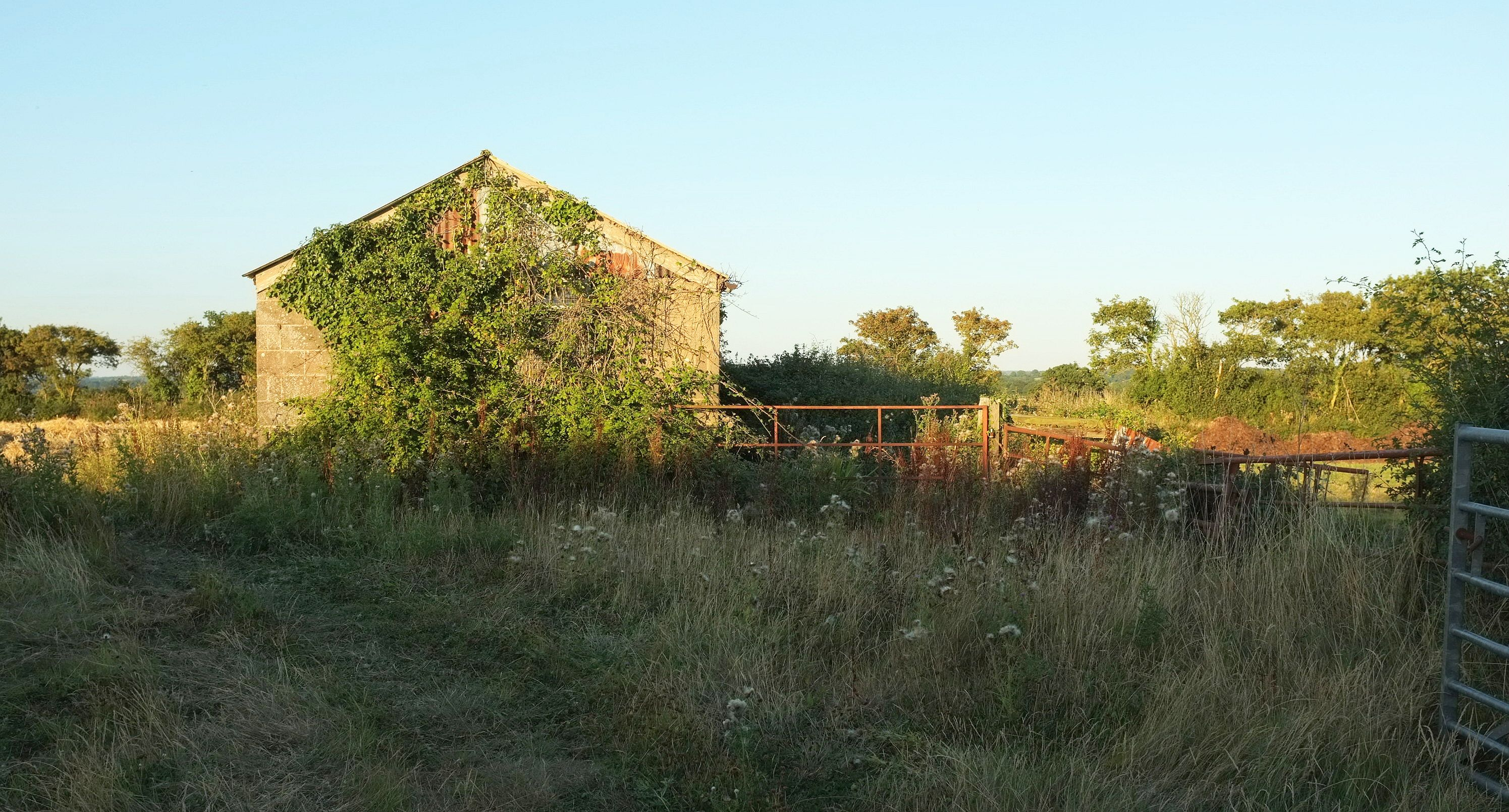
Barn near Exeter Airport

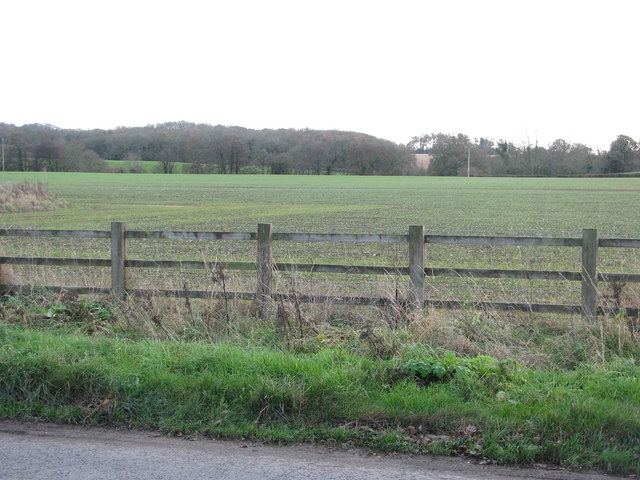
Roadside field south-east of Exeter Airport

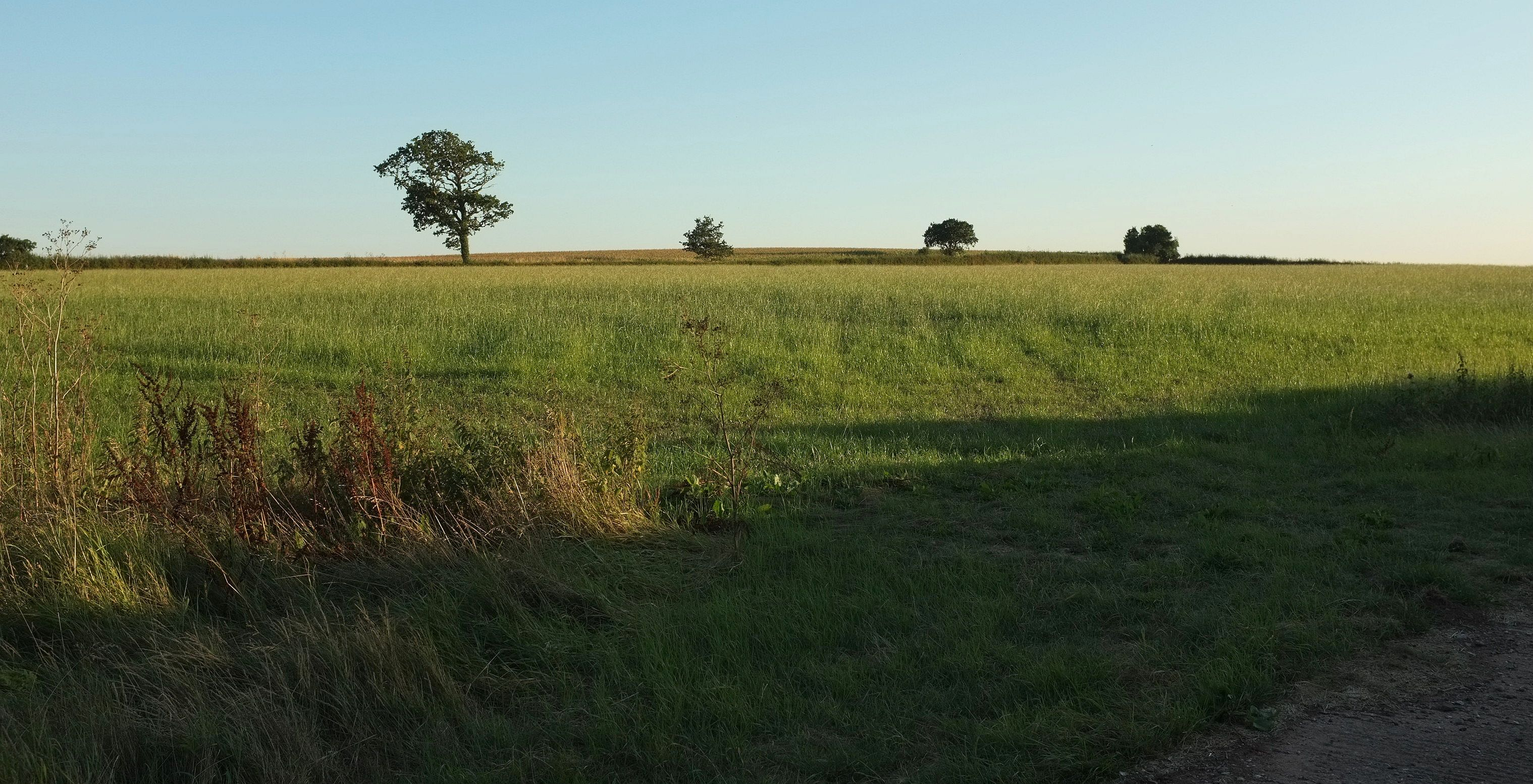
Field at Coney Mead

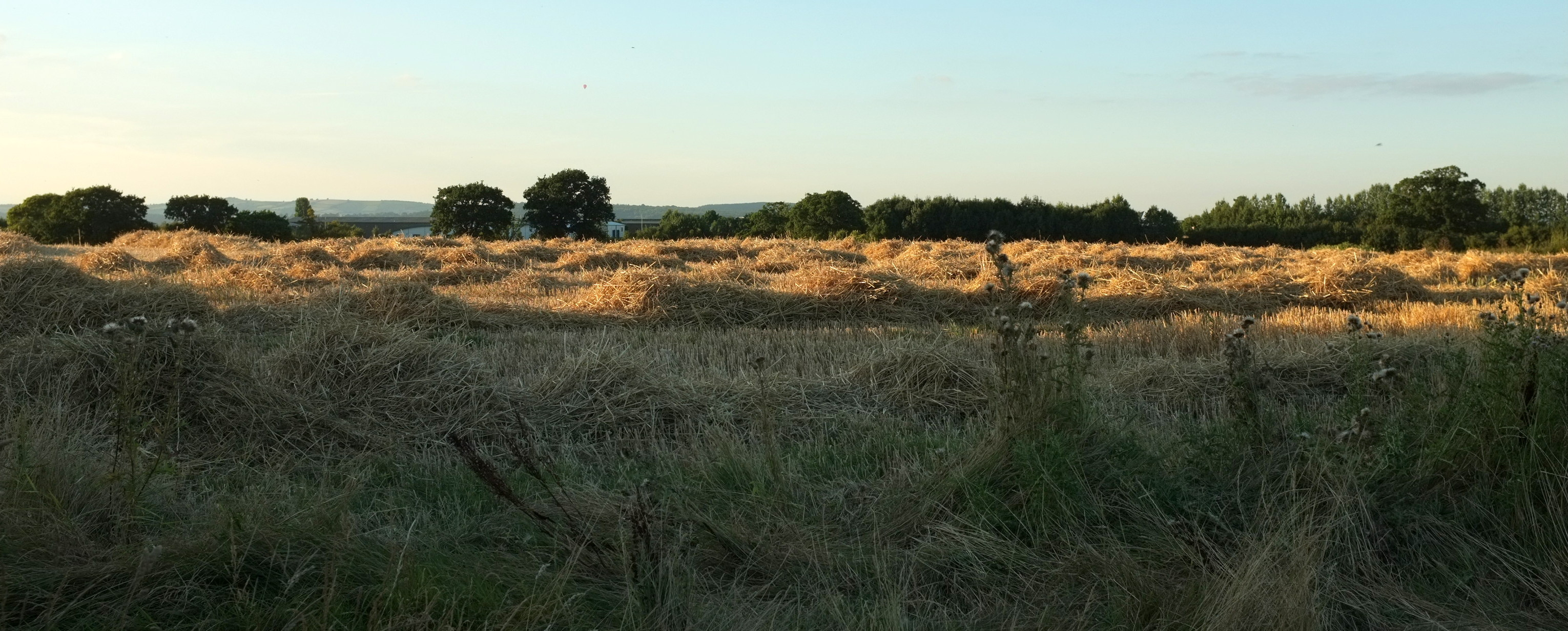
Field south of Exeter Airport

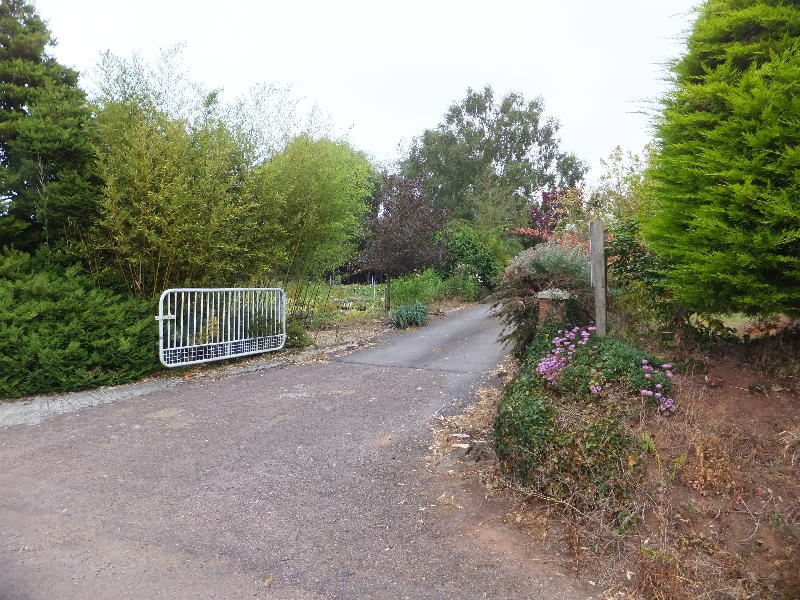
Wholesale plant nursery

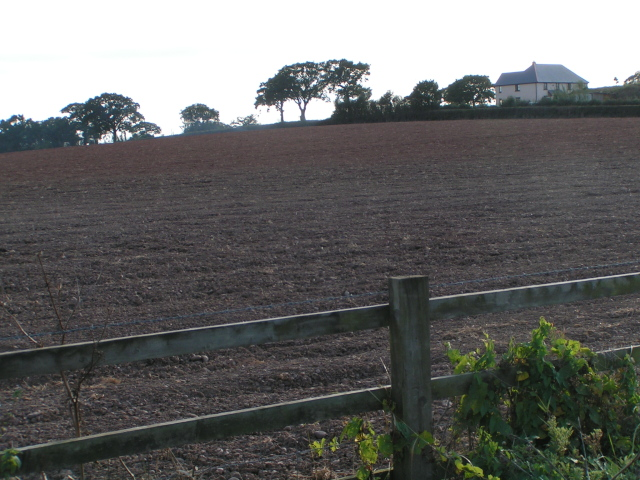
Field next to the B3184 near the A30, looking south-west toward Spain Farm

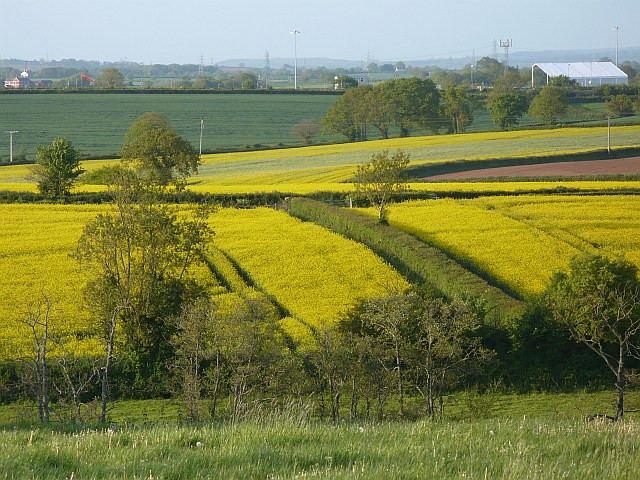
View across the Holbrook Valley

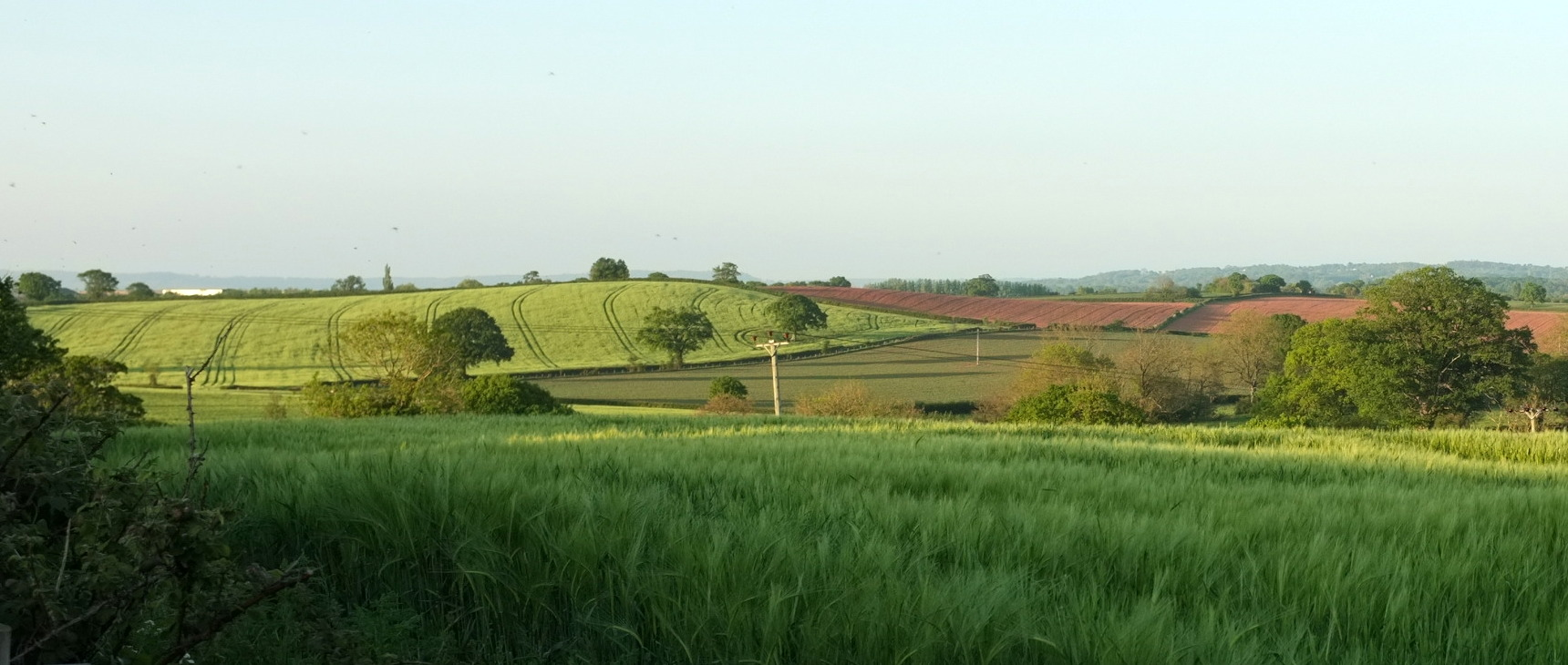
Farmland northeast of Holbrook Farm
