= Slapton =

Slapton may refer to the following places in the United Kingdom:

- Slapton, Buckinghamshire, a village and civil parish
- Slapton, Devon, a village and civil parish
- Slapton, Northamptonshire, a village

== See also ==
- Slapton Castle, an Iron Age hill fort near Slapton, Devon
- Slapton Ley, a lake on the south coast of Devon
- Slipton, Northamptonshire, a village
