= Beesands =

Village in Devon, England

Coordinates: 50°15′11″N 3°39′26″W

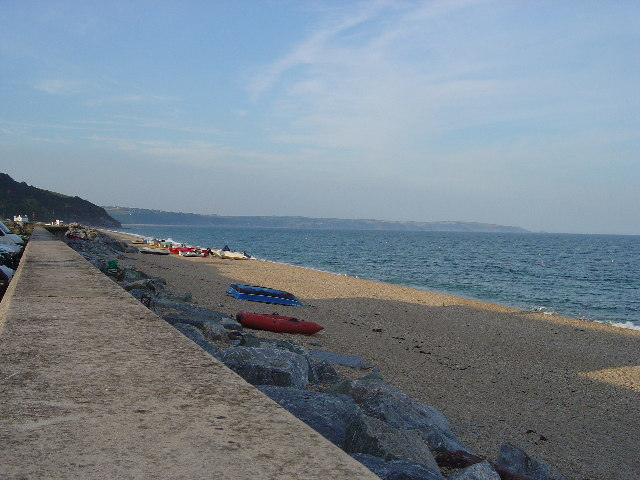
- Looking North along the beach at Beesands

- Location within Devon
- Civil parish: Stokenham
- Shire county: Devon
- Region: South West
- Country: England
- Sovereign state: United Kingdom
- Postcode district: TQ7
- Dialling code: 01548
- Police: Devon and Cornwall
- Fire: Devon and Somerset
- Ambulance: South Western
- UK Parliament: Totnes

Beesands is a small settlement located midway between Hallsands and Torcross on the coast of Start Bay in South Devon, England. It is best known as a tourist destination. However, it is still a fishing village that concentrates mainly on crab and lobster fishing through Britannia Fisheries. There is an Anglican chapel dedicated to St Andrew in the village. Behind the beach, north of the settlement, is a freshwater lake known as Widdecombe Ley, smaller but similar in ecology to Slapton Ley about a 3/4 mile (1.2 km) to the north.

Keith Richards' family regularly spent holidays at Beesands during the 1950s. Keith Richards and Mick Jagger's first public performance was at The Cricket Inn in the village.
