= Strete =

Village in Devon, England

Coordinates: 50.310°N 3.629°W

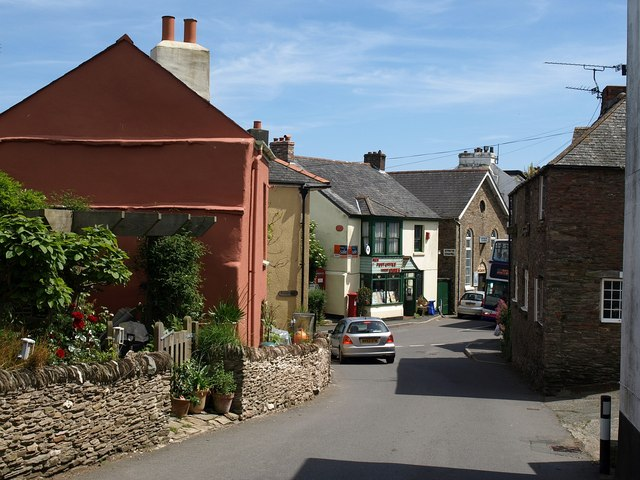
- Looking down Church Hill, Strete

- Location within Devon
- Population: 474 (2011)
- OS grid reference: SX841469
- Civil parish: Strete
- District: South Hams
- Shire county: Devon
- Region: South West
- Country: England
- Sovereign state: United Kingdom
- Post town: Dartmouth
- Postcode district: TQ6
- Dialling code: 01803
- Police: Devon and Cornwall
- Fire: Devon and Somerset
- Ambulance: South Western
- UK Parliament: Totnes

Strete is a coastal village and civil parish in the South Hams district of Devon, England, on the coast of Start Bay, within the South Devon National Landscape.

The village is about 5 miles south-west of the town of Dartmouth on the A379 road between Dartmouth and Kingsbridge, atop the cliffs behind Pilchard Cove at the north end of Slapton Sands, which part of the beach is known locally as Strete Sands. The northern end of the beach has been a naturist beach for many years.

The parish of Strete was created out of the south-eastern part of Blackawton parish in 1935. There was a small medieval chapel of ease in the village until 1836 when the present church, dedicated to St Michael, was built on the same site, incorporating the chapel's tower.

The population of the parish was 520 in 2001, decreasing to 474 in 2011. Its western boundary is formed, in part, by the Gara Brook which separates it from the parish of Slapton, and it also has boundaries with the parishes of Blackawton and Stoke Fleming. The Gara Brook flows into the Higher Ley of Slapton Ley, part of which is in the parish and at the northern end of which is Strete Gate where there is a small, free and a larger, pay-and-display car park with access to Strete Sands and a woodland walk.

The first documentary mention of the place was as Streta in 1194. In 1244 it was called Strete. The name derives from Old English Strǣt, meaning a road or Roman road; the village lies on an ancient trackway. Donn's One-Inch map of 1765 records the village as Street, which it remained until the late 19th century, when it was altered to be spelled Strete. (Note: According to a District Council document published in 2009, the re-naming occurred in 1870, but it is still shown as "Street" in White's Gazetteer of 1878.)

Strete was one of the parishes evacuated in December 1943 as part of Exercise Tiger.
