= Stokenham =

Village in Devon, England

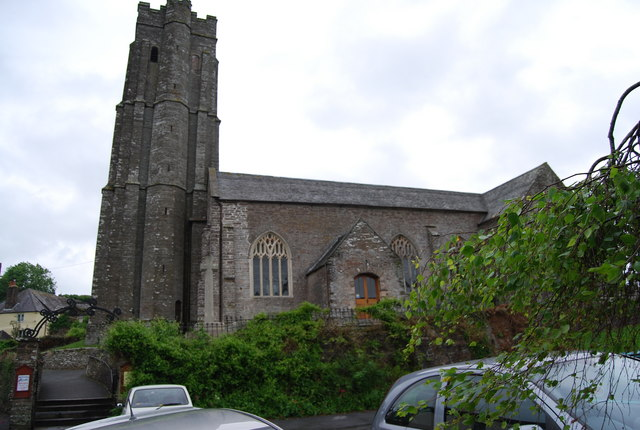

- Location within Devon
- Population: 1,895 (2011 census)
- Civil parish: Stokenham
- District: South Hams
- Shire county: Devon
- Region: South West
- Country: England
- Sovereign state: United Kingdom

Stokenham (/stoʊkənˈhæm/) is a village and civil parish in the South Hams district, in the county of Devon, England. The population of the parish at the 2011 census was 1,895.

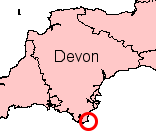
Stokenham, Devon.

== Pronunciation ==
For the great majority of towns in England with names ending in -ham the suffix is very weakly pronounced as /əm/ and the stress is always earlier in the word. In Birmingham, for example, the stress is on the first syllable. Stokenham is a clear exception, with the -ham fully enunciated and stressed.

== Places in the parish ==
As well as Stokenham the civil parish includes the settlements of Torcross, Beesands, Hallsands, Kellaton, Kernborough, Dunstone, Beeson and Chillington and Bickerton. It forms part of the district of South Hams.

Point	Coordinates (Links to map resources)	OS Grid Ref	Notes
Beesands	50.253°N 3.6572°W	SX818406	
Torcross	50.2666°N 3.6535°W	SX822420	

== History ==
The village of Stokenham was known in Saxon Times as Stoc or Stoc Hamme ("meaning Stoc meadows"). By the 13th century the town was called Stoke in Hamme. An electoral ward has the same name. The ward population at the 2011 census was 1,895.

In Mediaeval times St. Humbert the Confessor (d.1188AD) was locally venerated as patron saint in the town.

The area was known in the 19th century for the fine crabs, and in World War II local residents were evacuated from the area, on the eve of D-day.

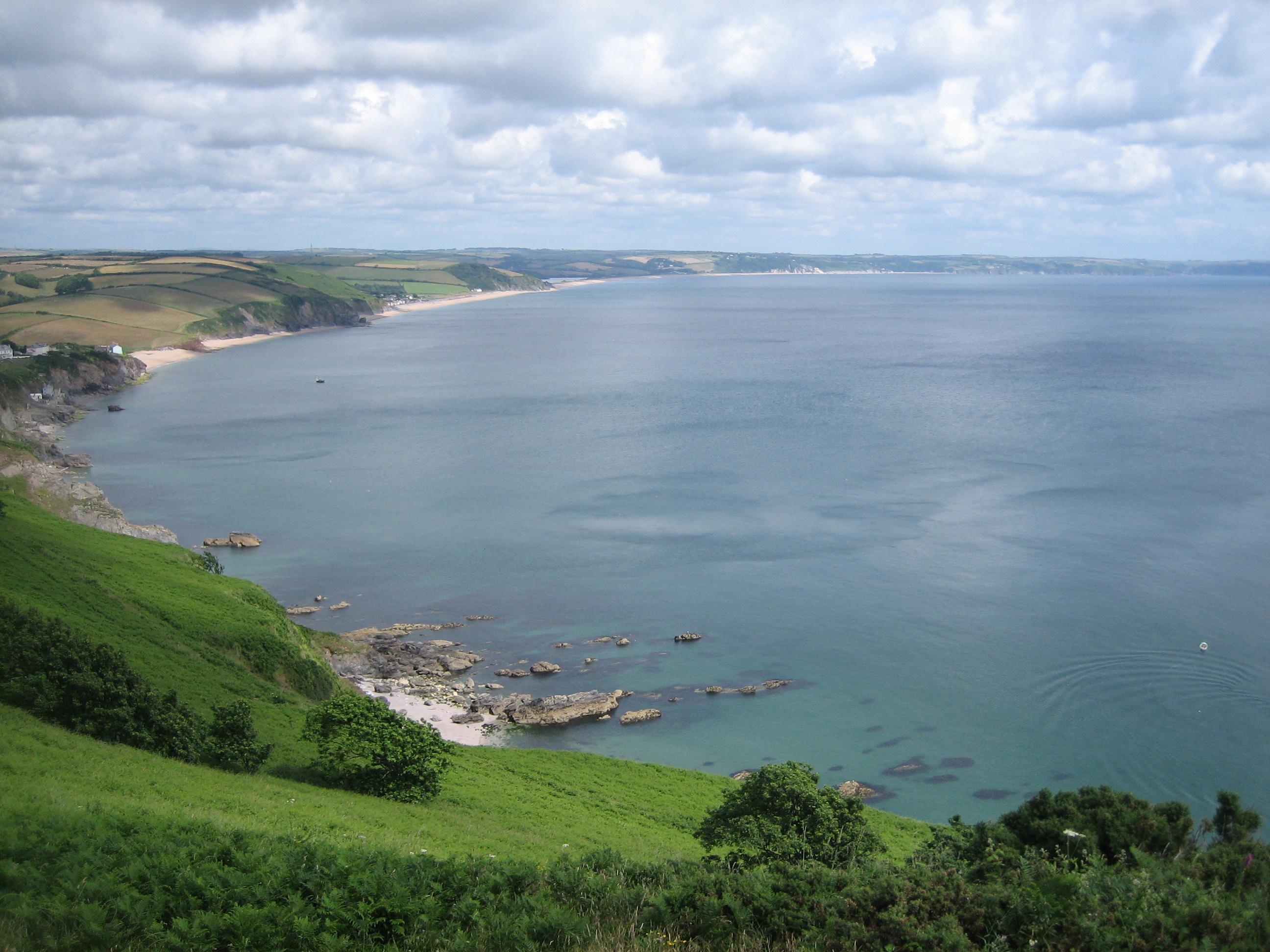
Start Bay looking north east

== Geography ==
To the east of the parish is Start Bay in the English Channel. The principal road in the parish is the A379 running between the nearest towns of Kingsbridge (to the west) and Dartmouth to the north.

== Local landmarks ==
=== The parish church ===
The present church dates from 1431; an earlier Norman church predated it.

It is believed to have been the site of an even earlier Anglo-Saxon Minster church.

"The church as it stands today, is a fine example of the perpendicular style of medieval architecture. It is built on the side of a hill so that its whole length can be seen from below and is dedicated to St Michael and All Angels, which was common practice for churches standing on elevated sites. It was, however, dedicated to St Barnabas and prior to that to St Humbert the Confessor."

=== Stokenham manor house ===
Immediately to the east of the church is the site of Stokenham manor house, abandoned in 1585 but possibly dating back to at least the 12th century.

=== Local pubs ===
Next to the church is The Church House Inn. This Late 15th, Early 16th century building was the original communal church house where ale was brewed to raise funds for the church. During the D-Day rehearsals in the evacuated zone the pub suffered a direct hit from naval shelling.

The Tradesman's Arms further up the hill, is an imposing 14th-century, part-thatched pub and restaurant.

On the 27 September 2021, a fire believed to have originated in the kitchen destroyed much of the pub alongside three neighbouring homes. The Tradesman's Arms was repaired having undergone a three-year restoration and building reconstruction, along with the fire damaged adjoining cottages which all reopened in May 2024.
