= Exercise Fabius =

Allied military exercise that took place prior to the Normandy landings

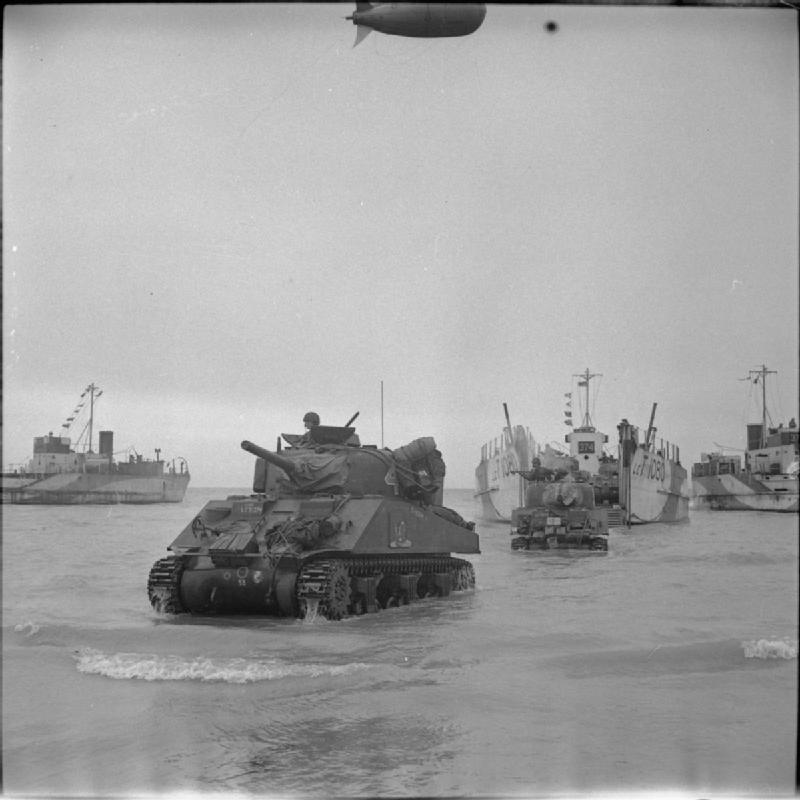
Sherman tanks of 50th Division driving ashore from landing craft during Exercise Fabius, Hayling Island, 6 May 1944 (Imperial War Museum)

Exercise Fabius (Note: The exercise is sometimes referred to by sources as 'Operation Fabius'.) was a military exercise for the Allied Operation Neptune in World War II.

== Planning and preparatory exercises ==
Exercise Fabius was a military exercise scheduled by SHAEF for the Allied Operation Neptune in World War II. One of two major rehearsals planned prior to D-Day, it followed Exercise Tiger, which had occurred a week earlier. Fabius was scheduled in February 1944.

As the nature of the exercise was thought by the London Controlling Section and the Committee of Special Means to possibly convince the enemy that the planned invasion of France would take place of the Normandy beaches, a deception plan was devised. Three double agents, Tricycle, Brutus, and Garbo, told their contacts in Germany that the planned exercises (including Fabius) would be completed shortly before 20 July, the date of the invasion. The date they gave was false.

The British Field Marshal Bernard Montgomery, who had been assigned to command Allied ground forces participating in Operation Overlord, insisted that the number of divisions involved in the exercise was increased from three to five. The assault forces were codenamed "O", "U" (the Western taskforce, which as American), and "J", "G", and "S" (the Eastern taskforce, composed of British and Canadian troops).

== Exercises and outcomes ==
Exercise Fabius took place from 3–8 May 1944. It was due to start on 2 May, but was delayed by bad weather. It consisted of six separate exercises. Fabius 1 involved elements of the 1st Infantry Division and 29th Infantry Division (United States) which practised amphibious landing at Slapton Sands. Fabius 2 involved elements of the 50th Infantry Division which practised landings at Hayling Island. Fabius 3 involved elements of the 3rd Canadian Infantry Division that practised landings at Bracklesham Bay. Fabius 4 involved elements of the 3rd Infantry Division and associated units. They practised landing at Littlehampton. Fabius 5 and 6 was an exercise for American and British forces working on the buildup of forces and supplies on the Allied beaches.

The invasion rehearsal was cut short by bad weather at the end of 4 May.

Fabius formed the largest amphibious training exercise of the war. It was the final rehearsal before Operation Neptune. No major changes were made to the plans for the D-Day landings.

== Sources ==
- Barbier, Mary K. (2007). D-Day Deception: Operation Fortitude and the Normandy Invasion. London: Bloomsbury Publishing. ISBN 9781567207538.
- Heathcote, Tony A. (1999). The British Field Marshals 1736–1997: A Biographical Dictionary. Barnsley, UK: Pen & Sword. ISBN 978-0-85052-696-7.
- Yung, Christopher (2006). Gators of Neptune: Naval Amphibious Planning for the Normandy Invasion. Annapolis, Maryland: Naval Institute Press. ISBN 978-1-59114-997-2.
