= Chillington =

Chillington may refer to:

- Chillington, Devon
- Chillington, Somerset
- Chillington Hall, Staffordshire
- Chilton, Wisconsin, originally named Chillington after one of the English towns
