= HMS Saladin =

Royal Navy S class destroyer

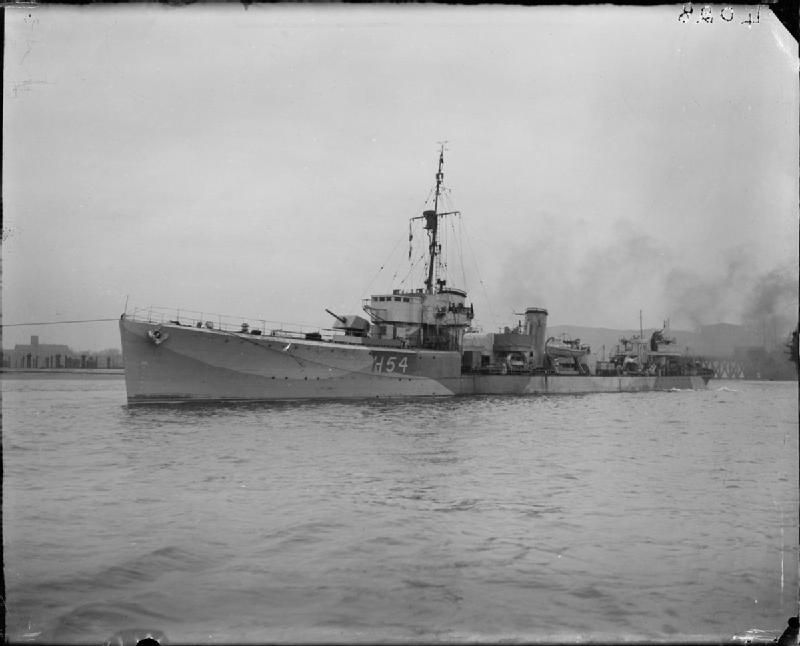
- Saladin between 1939 and 1945

History

United Kingdom
- Name: Saladin
- Namesake: Saladin
- Ordered: 7 April 1917
- Builder: Stephen, Linthouse
- Laid down: 10 September 1917
- Launched: 17 February 1918
- Completed: 11 April 1919
- Out of service: 29 June 1947
- Fate: Sold to be broken up

General characteristics
- Class & type: S-class destroyer
- Displacement: 1,075 long tons (1,092 t) normal; 1,221 long tons (1,241 t) deep load
- Length: 265 ft (80.8 m) p.p.
- Beam: 26 ft 9 in (8.15 m)
- Draught: 9 ft 10 in (3.00 m) mean
- Propulsion: 3 Yarrow boilers; 2 geared Brown-Curtis steam turbines, 27,000 shp
- Speed: 36 knots (41.4 mph; 66.7 km/h)
- Range: 2,750 nmi (5,090 km) at 15 kn (28 km/h)
- Complement: 90
- Armament: 3 × single QF 4 in (102 mm) guns; 1 × single 2-pdr 40 mm (2 in) Mk. II AA gun; 2 × twin 21 in (533 mm) torpedo tubes; 4 × depth charge chutes

HMS Saladin was an Admiralty S-class destroyer that served with the Royal Navy in the Second World War. The S class was a development of the R class created during the First World War as a cheaper alternative to the V and W class. Launched in 1919 soon after the Armistice, the ship was commissioned into the Reserve Fleet and had an uneventful career until 1939. Upgraded shortly after the start of the Second World War with greater anti-aircraft and anti-submarine capabilities, Saladin served as an escort, usually for convoys of merchant ships, for the majority of the war. The ship was damaged by German aircraft while assisting in the Dunkirk evacuation in 1940 and involved in escorting the landing parties for the Normandy landings in 1944. After surviving the war, Saladin was retired and handed over to be broken up in 1947.

== Design and development ==
Saladin was one of 33 Admiralty S-class destroyers ordered by the British Admiralty on 7 April 1917 as part of the Eleventh War Construction Programme. The design was a development of the R class introduced at the same time as, and as a cheaper and faster alternative to, the V and W class. Differences with the R class were minor, such as having the searchlight moved aft and being designed to mount an additional pair of torpedo tubes.

The destroyer had an overall length of 276 ft (84 m) and a length of 265 ft (81 m) between perpendiculars. Beam was 26 ft 8 in (8.13 m) and mean draught 9 ft 10 in (3.00 m). Displacement was 1,075 long tons (1,092 t) normal and 1,221 long tons (1,241 t) deep load. Three Yarrow boilers fed steam to two sets of Brown-Curtis geared steam turbines rated at 27,000 shaft horsepower (20,000 kW) and driving two shafts, giving a design speed of 36 knots (67 km/h; 41 mph) at normal loading and 32.5 knots (60.2 km/h; 37.4 mph) at deep load. Two funnels were fitted. A full load of 301 long tons (306 t) of fuel oil was carried, which gave a design range of 2,750 nautical miles (5,090 km; 3,160 mi) at 15 knots (28 km/h; 17 mph).

Armament consisted of three QF 4 in (102 mm) Mk IV guns on the ship's centreline. One was mounted raised on the forecastle, one on a platform between the funnels, and one aft. The ship also mounted a single 2-pounder 40 mm (1.6 in) "pom-pom" anti-aircraft gun for air defence. Four 21 in (533 mm) torpedo tubes were carried in two twin rotating mounts aft. Four depth charge chutes were also fitted aft. Initially, typically ten depth charges were carried. The ship was designed to mount two additional 18 in (457 mm) torpedo tubes either side of the superstructure but this required the forecastle plating to be cut away, causing excess water to come aboard at sea, so they were removed. The weight saved enabled the heavier Mark V 21-inch torpedo to be carried. Fire control included a training-only director, single Dumaresq and a Vickers range clock. The ship had a complement of 90 officers and ratings.

== Construction and career ==
Laid down on 10 September 1917 during the First World War by Alexander Stephen and Sons at their dockyard in Linthouse, Glasgow, Saladin was launched on 17 February 1919 after the Armistice that ended the war and completed on 11 April. The vessel was the only one in Royal Navy service named for Saladin, the founder of the Ayyubid dynasty, conqueror of Jerusalem and opponent of Richard I in the Third Crusade. Saladin was commissioned into the Reserve Fleet in Portsmouth on 18 August 1920. The following few years were generally uneventful, the vessel serving as the emergency destroyer at Plymouth for much of the period. On 19 June 1933, the destroyer formed part of the escort for King Faisal on a state visit. On 17 September, the vessel took part in a water carnival in Brighton, the ship's searchlight adding to fireworks and other displays that celebrated the collaboration between the town and the city of Bristol. On 16 July 1935, the destroyer was one of over 100 ships of the Royal Navy in a fleet review to celebrate the Silver Jubilee of George V. Saladin was relieved as emergency destroyer by the newer W-class destroyer Westminster on 1 October and became an independent operator under the retired first rate ship of the line HMS Victory at Plymouth.

At the start of the Second World War, Saladin was in reserve at Portsmouth. It was intended that the warship would be sent to join the Eastern Fleet, but this was delayed by a boiler retubing. Instead, the destroyer was upgraded as an escort to join the Sixteenth Destroyer Flotilla. The aft gun and torpedo tubes were removed and a high-angle QF 12-pounder anti-aircraft gun was fitted on a bandstand abaft the middle funnel. Two quadruple Vickers .50 machine guns were also mounted for close-in defence. ASDIC was installed along with eight depth charge throwers and new depth charge rails aft. A total of 112 depth charges were now carried. On 28 and 29 May 1940, while assisting in the Dunkirk evacuation of 47,310 British troops as part of Operation Dynamo, Saladin was attacked ten times by the German Luftwaffe, receiving multiple hits but none that put the ship out of action. Nonetheless, the ship's engine room was so severely damaged that the vessel had to sail back to Dover at 15 knots (28 km/h; 17 mph) and could take no part in the evacuation. The destroyer was swiftly repaired ready to return to service. On 9 June, the ship was dispatched as part of the escort for a flotilla of ships sent to evacuate soldiers from Le Havre. Despite bombing from the Luftwaffe, 11,059 British troops were rescued by the flotilla on 11 June. The following day, the destroyer arrived in St Valery, and evacuated an additional 15 sailors.

For the majority of the war, Saladin acted as a convoy escort. Between May 1940 and May 1944, the destroyer accompanied 76 convoys, including nine travelling from Halifax, Nova Scotia to Liverpool. Between 11 and 15 September 1941, the destroyer formed part of the Second Escort Group that accompanied Convoy SC 42. Apart from the loss of one merchant ship, the escorts managed to prevent successful attacks from German submarines, including U-43 and U-84 during the following night, and sank U-207. Saladin remained part of the escort group for the remainder of the year, accompanying the Atlantic convoys ON 18 on 21 September, ON 25 on 13 October and HX 154 on 19 October. The following year saw the destroyer join the Seventh Escort Group, escorting the arctic convoy Convoy PQ 13 between 11 and 16 March. The passage was uneventful. During this time, the destroyer was upgraded again. The 12-pounder was removed and a Type 271 radar fitted instead while two single Oerlikon 20 mm cannon replaced the Vickers machine guns. These changes also increased the ship's displacement, which nearly reached 1,400 long tons (1,400 t).

In January 1944, Saladin was transferred to Plymouth to serve in the English Channel. On 25 March 1944, Saladin rescued seven survivors from a Short Sunderland flying boat that had been shot down over the Bay of Biscay on 23 March. On 28 April, the destroyer helped rescue survivors from LST-507 and LST-531, sunk by German E-boats during Exercise Tiger, a rehearsal of the Normandy landings. Nonetheless, between 639 and 749 US Army soldiers and US Navy sailors lost their lives in the exercise. Saladin had been dispatched to escort the convoy but a problem with number one boiler meant that the vessel was only able to make 23 knots (43 km/h; 26 mph) and did not arrive in time for the action. The destroyer subsequently formed part of the escort for the Normandy landings. In December, the vessel was placed into reserve at Falmouth. With the demobilisation of the British Armed Forces after the Second World War, Saladin was decommissioned from service. On 29 June 1947, the ship was retired and handed over to be broken up by Rees at Llanelly.

== Pennant numbers ==
Penant numbers
Pennant number	Date
F0A	May 1919
HA1	November 1919
H54	January 1922
