= Start Bay =

Bay in Devon, England

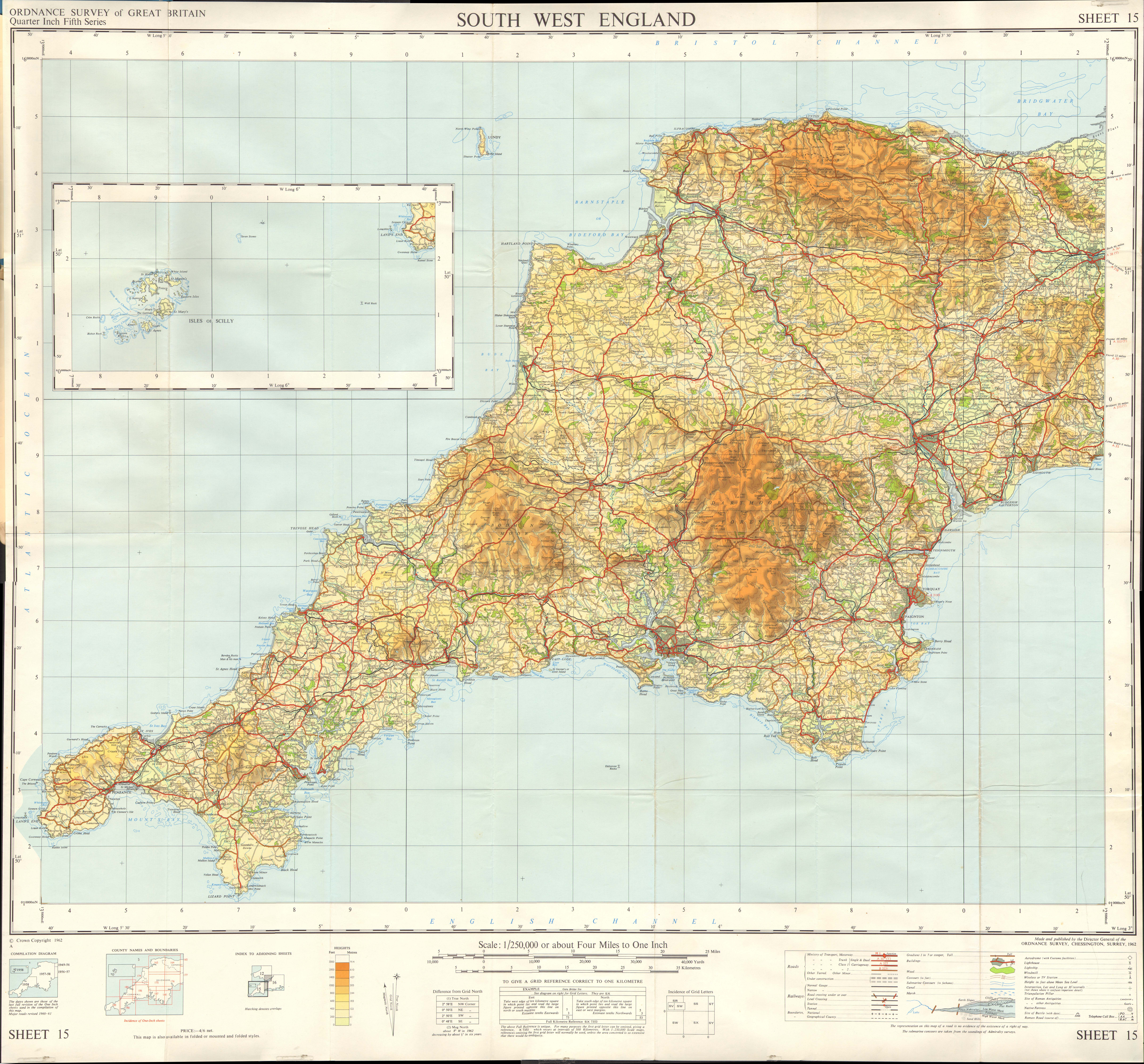
Map of the three east-facing bays of the Lyme Bay sheltered part of the English Channel

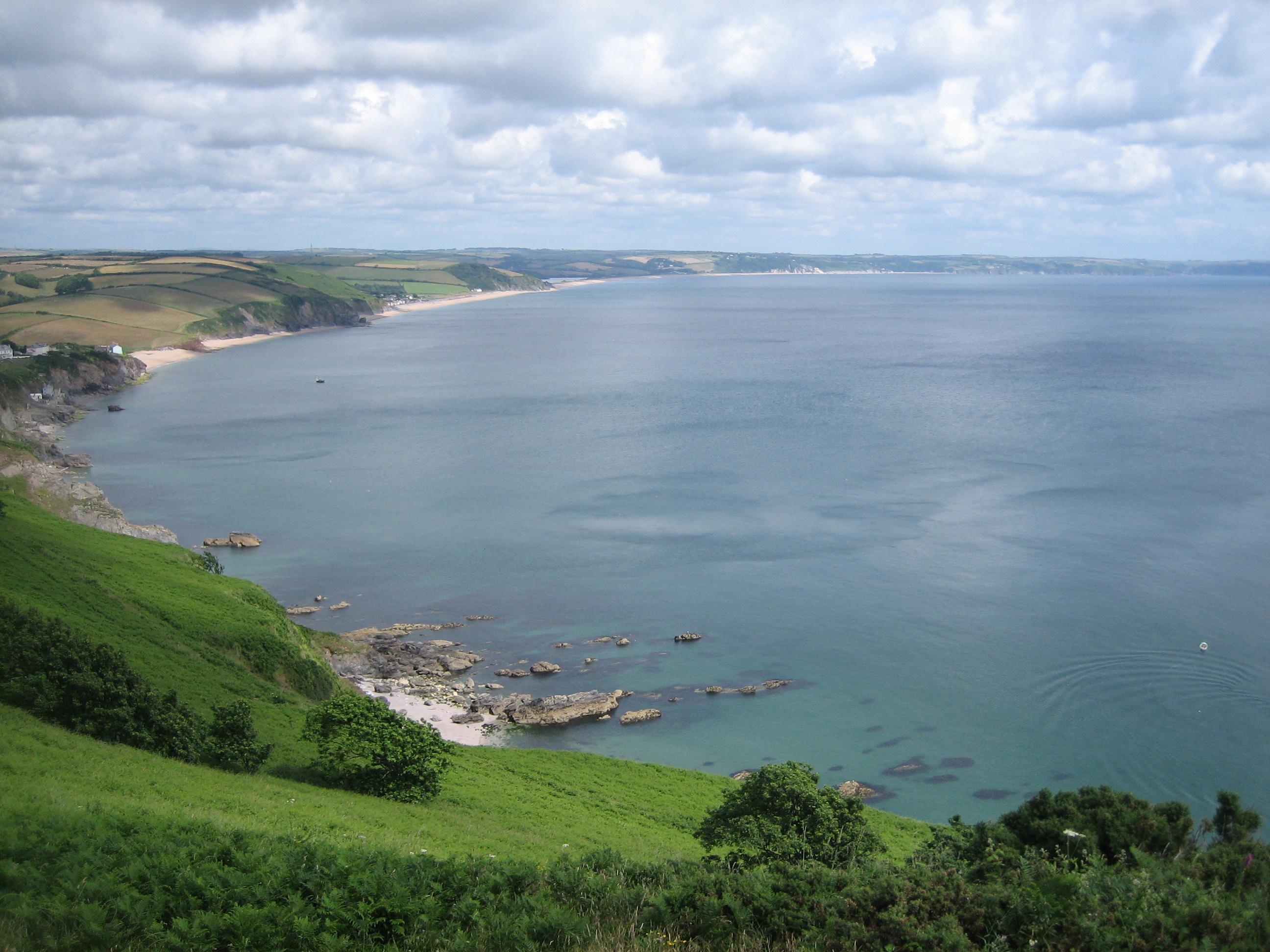
Start Bay looking NNE from near its southern end

Start Bay is a sub-bay of the nautical definition of Lyme Bay in the English Channel in south-east Devon, England. The southernmost of three substantial Devon bays facing east it is between the Mew Stone which sits east of the River Dart's estuary and Start Point near the southernmost point of the county, Prawle Point. Along it, from south to north, are Hallsands, Beesands, Torcross, Slapton Sands, Strete, Blackpool Sands and Stoke Fleming. The South West Coast Path is above much of the bay. Its north end is 1.5 miles (2.4 km) south of Dartmouth; its middle is 4 miles (6.4 km) east of Kingsbridge.

The 4-gun Royal Navy cutter Friendship was stationed here as a patrol vessel from 1763 to 1771.

A division of the US Army used Slapton Sands to rehearse the Normandy landings in 1944, but was attacked by German vessels.

== See also ==
- Lyme Bay, the parent bay
  - Tor Bay
  - Babbacombe Bay
