= Lyme Bay =

Area of the English Channel

Coordinates: 50°42′N 2°54′W

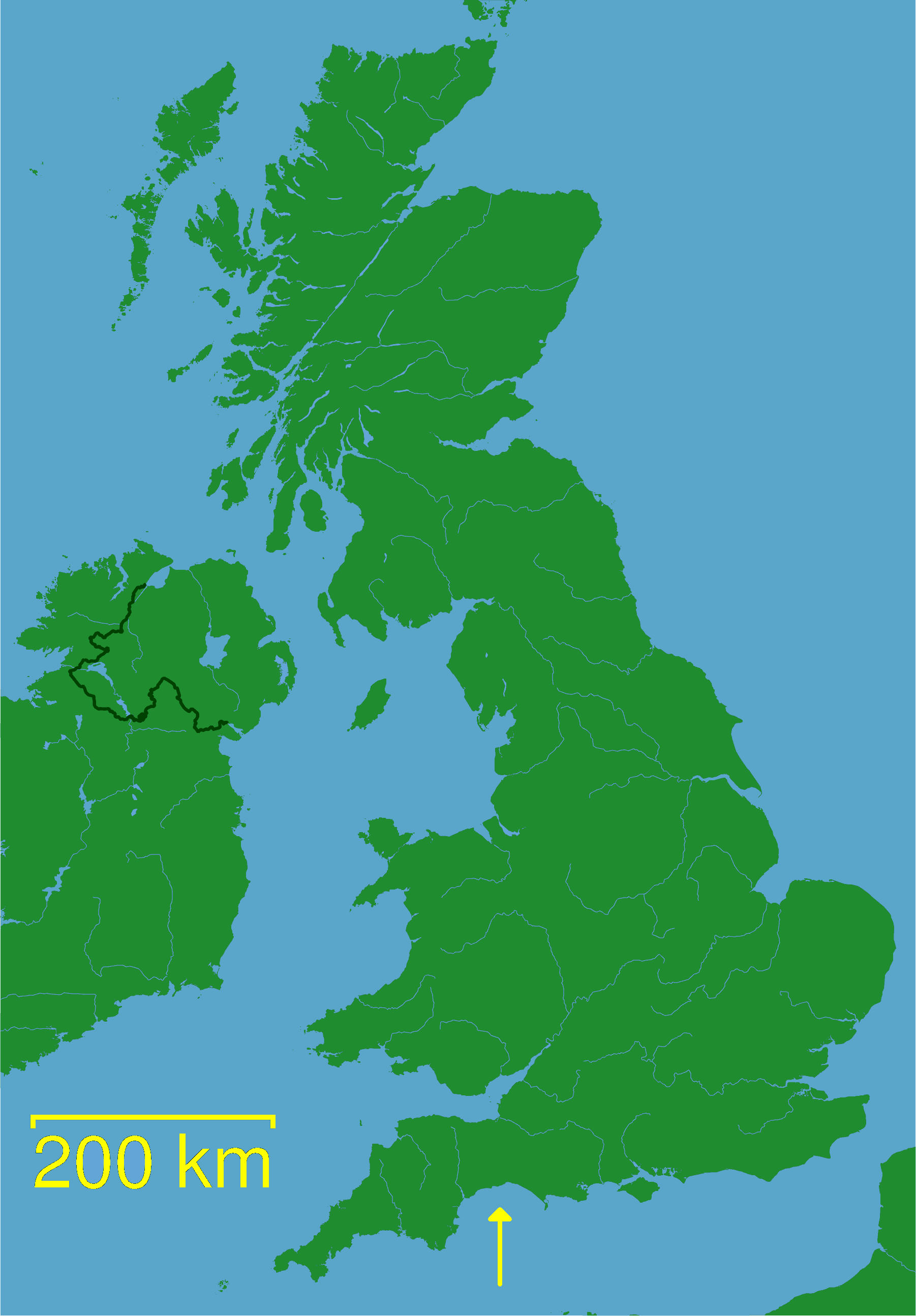
Lyme Bay shown within Great Britain

Lyme Bay is an area of the English Channel off the south coast of England. The south western counties of Devon and Dorset front onto the bay.

The exact definitions of the bay vary. The eastern boundary is usually taken to be Portland Bill on the Isle of Portland, but there is no consensus over the western boundary. The broadest definition places the boundary at Start Point, and therefore includes Tor Bay and Start Bay as areas within Lyme Bay. A narrow definition gives the western boundary as Hope's Nose headland, excluding Tor Bay and Start Bay, used for example by the Water Framework Directive definitions of waterbodies. Other definitions place the boundary somewhere between these two points, including at Dartmouth (used by the Lyme Bay West Marine Character Area) and Berry Head.

== Geology ==
1954 Nautical chart of Lyme Bay

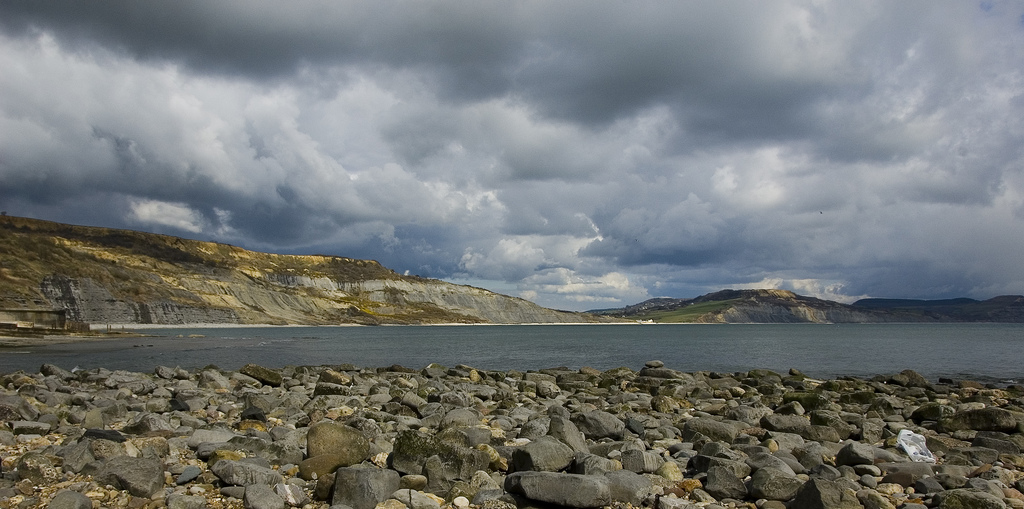
Golden Cap across Lyme Bay from Lyme Regis.

The east of the bay is part of a World Heritage Site, the Dorset and East Devon Coast, which is also known as the Jurassic Coast, named for its Jurassic geology.

== History ==
Many of the earliest discoveries of dinosaur and other prehistoric reptile remains were in the area surrounding Lyme Regis and Charmouth. Notable among these were the discoveries made by self-educated palaeontologist and fossil collector Mary Anning, in the 1820s.

The weather in the bay is temperate by English standards, and far more temperate than many other places at a similar latitude. The reason for this is the warming action of the Gulf Stream. The area along the coast of Lyme Bay is thus a popular holiday destination. On 22 March 1993, four schoolchildren died in what is known as the Lyme Bay kayaking tragedy.

Lyme Bay was the site of Exercise Tiger, a practice run for the D-Day invasion of France in 1944, using the beach called Slapton Sands near Slapton, Devon as the practice landing zone. The operation was intercepted by German E-boats that attacked the landing craft, killing 749 American Army and Navy personnel in the middle of Babbacombe Bay, the most unbounded western sub-bay of the bay.

A ship commissioned in 2007 for the Royal Fleet Auxiliary carries the name: RFA Lyme Bay.

== Underwater ==
Much of the subsurface realm is locally unspectacular, without underwater rock cliffs painted with a riot of colour nor very clear water. The reefs in Lyme bay are mostly low lying and the waters tend to be fairly gloomy and turbid. As an essentially large, open, sandy bay exposed to the prevailing winds, much suspended sediment (at least near-shore, close to the seabed) exists. Whilst winds may ease in summer, it is also prone to strong plankton blooms during May and June, with a less pronounced bloom in late summer. Thus underwater visibility rarely exceeds 10 metres (30 ft) and frequently may be less than 3 metres (10 ft). The reefs in the bay, numerous in the centre and east, are mostly discontinuous, forming a patchwork of low rocky outcrops surrounded by sediment. This means that they tend to be covered by thin veneers of sediment as tide and wave action lifts and sweeps saltating sand across them. The amount of sand will vary, depending on the size of the reef, how high it rises above the surrounding sediment plain, the strength of tidal streams in that part of the bay and how strong the wind has been recently (and thus how big the waves). Conversely the reef ecosystems are different from clearer water reefs further west.

== Wildlife ==
Tank wrecks from the D-Day practice provide a venue for diving. Marine life includes the Devon cup coral (Caryophyllia smithii) and pink sea fan (Eunicella verrucosa) . The pink seafan is a nationally protected species that occurs in very high densities on some of the limestone reefs in Lyme Bay. Reefs in the Eastern part of Lyme Bay support a population of sunset corals (Leptopsammia pruvoti). Sunset corals are one of the very few species of true corals (i.e. stony, or scleractinian, corals found in British waters. Sunset corals are rare in British waters, known to occur at only a handful of locations. The Lyme Bay supports one of the densest populations found around the UK and also the easternmost population known in UK waters.

The reefs have been under threat from scallop dredging which, if unregulated, might destroy the coral's habitat. Devon Wildlife Trust has been campaigning to protect the reefs, calling for an end to the dredging and trawling within a 60-square-mile (160 km^{2}) zone to help the reefs recover. About 20% of this area is now protected by a voluntary agreement made between the DEFRA and the fishermen of the South West Inshore Fishermen's Association.

== Settlements ==
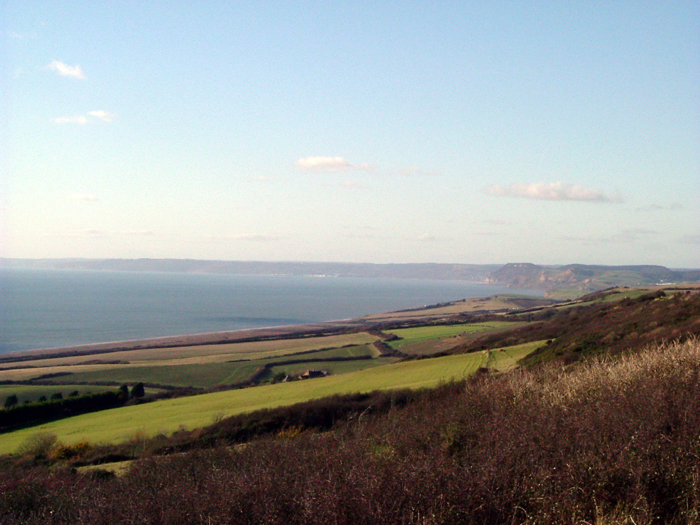
Golden Cap and East Devon from Burton Bradstock.

Towns and villages marked * fall outside some of the narrower definitions of Lyme Bay.

- Abbotsbury
- Axmouth
- Beer
- Branscombe
- Brixham*
- Budleigh Salterton
- Charlestown, Dorset
- Charmouth
- Dartmouth*
- Dawlish
- Dawlish Warren
- Exmouth
- Eype
- Fortuneswell -and the Isle of Portland
- Lyme Regis
- Otterton
- Paignton*
- Seaton
- Sidmouth
- Teignmouth
- Torquay
- West Bay

== Rivers ==
Rivers that flow into Lyme Bay include the Exe, Otter, Teign, Dart, Sid and Axe in Devon, and the Lim, Char, Brit and Bride in Dorset.

== Shipping and sea conditions forecast ==
The whole bay forms the northwest of Portland in the UK's shipping forecast.
