= Slapton Castle =

Iron Age hill fort in Devon, England

Coordinates: 50.2872°N 3.6743°W

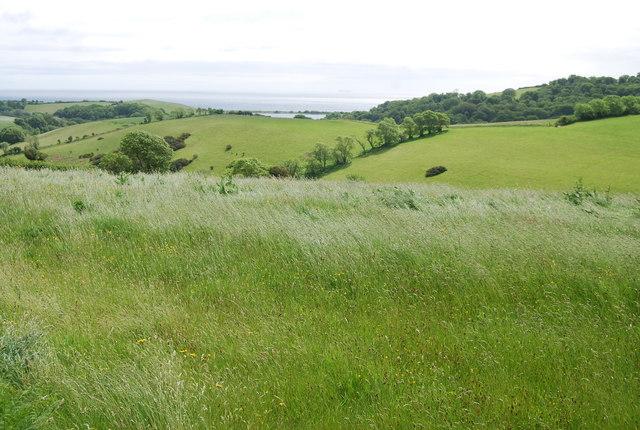
The site of Slapton Castle

Slapton Castle is an Iron Age hill fort situated close to Slapton in Devon, England. The fort is on a promontory on the eastern side of a hilltop at approximately 65 metres (213 ft) above sea level, overlooking Slapton Ley.
