= Anthogona britannica =

Conservation status
- Near Threatened (IUCN 3.1)

Scientific classification
- Kingdom: Animalia
- Phylum: Arthropoda
- Subphylum: Myriapoda
- Class: Diplopoda
- Order: Chordeumatida
- Family: Anthogonidae
- Genus: Anthogona
- Species: A. britannica

Binomial name
- Anthogona britannica Gregory, Jones & Mauriès, 1993

Species of millipede

Anthogona britannica is a species of millipede in the genus Anthogona, endemic to the British Isles, where it is nationally rare and has an International Union for Conservation of Nature status of "near threatened".

According to the British Myriapod and Isopod Group, adults are no longer than 7mm, brown, "with distinct paranota on the side of the body and eyes comprising about 10 to 12 well-pigmented ommatidi".

The species was described by Steve J. Gregory, Richard E. Jones and Jean-Paul Mauriès in 1993, from type specimens found at Slapton Ley, Devon, in 1983 and further specimens collected in 1992. All known sightings have been in south Devon. It is the only millipede known to be endemic in Britain.

This species was rediscovered and photographed in 2023, after nearly thirty years without any sightings.
