= USS LST-507 =

US Tank landing ship sunk off the south coast of England, now a dive site

History

United States
- Name: USS LST-507
- Builder: Jeffersonville Boat & Machine Company, Jeffersonville, Indiana
- Laid down: 8 September 1943
- Launched: 16 November 1943
- Commissioned: 10 January 1944
- Stricken: 09 June 1944
- Fate: Torpedoed and sunk, 28 April 1944

General characteristics
- Class & type: LST-491-class tank landing ship
- Displacement: 1,625 long tons (1,651 t) light; 3,640 long tons (3,698 t) full
- Length: 328 ft (100 m)
- Beam: 50 ft (15 m)
- Draft: Unloaded : 2 ft 4 in (0.71 m) forward; 7 ft 6 in (2.29 m) aft; Loaded : 8 ft 2 in (2.49 m) forward; 14 ft 1 in (4.29 m) aft
- Propulsion: 2 × General Motors 12-567 diesel engines, two shafts, twin rudders
- Speed: 12 knots (22 km/h; 14 mph)
- Range: 24,000 miles at 9 knots (17 km/h; 10 mph)
- Boats & landing craft carried: 2 LCVPs
- Troops: Approximately 120 officers and enlisted men
- Complement: 13 officers, 104 enlisted men
- Armament: 1 × single 3"/50 caliber gun mount; 8 × 40 mm guns; 12 × 20 mm guns

USS LST-507 was a LST-491-class tank landing ship built for the United States Navy during World War II. She was sunk by a German torpedo attack in April 1944 during Operation Tiger.

LST-507 was laid down on 8 September 1943 at Jeffersonville, Indiana, by the Jeffersonville Boat & Machine Co.; launched on 16 November 1943; sponsored by Mrs. Raymond C. Fuller; and commissioned on 10 January 1944.

== Sinking ==
Operation Tiger was a pre-invasion exercise carried out off the coast of Southern England on 28 April 1944 in preparation for the upcoming Normandy Landings.

After having taken on its complement of personnel and vehicles at Brixham, the LST joined the end of a convoy at Torquay. Just after 02:00, whilst circling Lyme Bay, the convoy was attacked by a group of German E-boats. LST-507 was the first to be hit by a torpedo at 02:03, and had to be abandoned by 02:30. It partially floated till dawn and then the bow was sunk by fire from a British destroyer. It was the only LST (out of the three hit, of which two sank) to go up in flames. Of the 700 estimated US Army and Navy fatalities during Exercise Tiger, 202 were from the sinking of LST-507.

LST-507 was struck from the Naval Register on 9 June 1944.

== Units on board ==
The army units were: 478th Amphibious Truck Company, 557th Quartermaster Railhead Company, 33rd Chemical Company, 440th Engineer Company, 1605th Engineer Map Depot Detachment, 175th Signal Repair Company, 3206th Quartermaster Service Company and 3891st Quartermaster Truck Company. There were two 1/4 ton trucks, one 3/4 ton truck, thirteen 2½ ton trucks, and 22 DUKWs.

== Wreck ==
The wreck of the LST now lies at a depth of 50 metres (160 ft) at 50°27.15′N 2°43.55′W. This wreck site and that of LST-531 are classed as protected wrecks, and so diving without a licence is not possible.

== See also ==
- List of United States Navy LSTs
