= Ella Trout =

British sea rescuer

Ella Trout (16 November 1896 – 16 June 1952) was a fisherwoman from Hallsands, Devon, England, who helped rescue nine men from a sinking ship. Ella was one of four sisters, the others being Patience, Clara and Edith.

When their fisherman father, William, became sick, Patience and then Ella gave up school and operated his boat, providing the family's only source of income. William died in 1910, when the two fishing girls were 14 and 15 years old. Their cottage and the village were destroyed in January 1917 in a storm as result of the dredging of the shingle beach years before, which protected the village beside the beach of Hallsands.

On 8 September 1917, Ella was out in a boat crab fishing with her 10-year-old cousin, William Trout, when they saw the SS Newholm strike a German naval mine, one mile south of Start Point. They, along with William Stone, another fisherman in the vicinity, rowed to the scene and helped rescue nine men. Ella and William Trout rescued one sailor, but with the tide and the wind against them, they were unable to row back to shore. They, in turn, were towed back to safety by William Stone. In recognition of her bravery, she received the Order of the British Empire.

The sisters, with compensation for the destruction of their cottage at Hallsands and their own earnings, built Trout's Hotel on the cliff above the deserted village. The hotel was run successfully until 1959.
