= Slapton, Devon =

Village and civil parish in Devon, England

Slapton
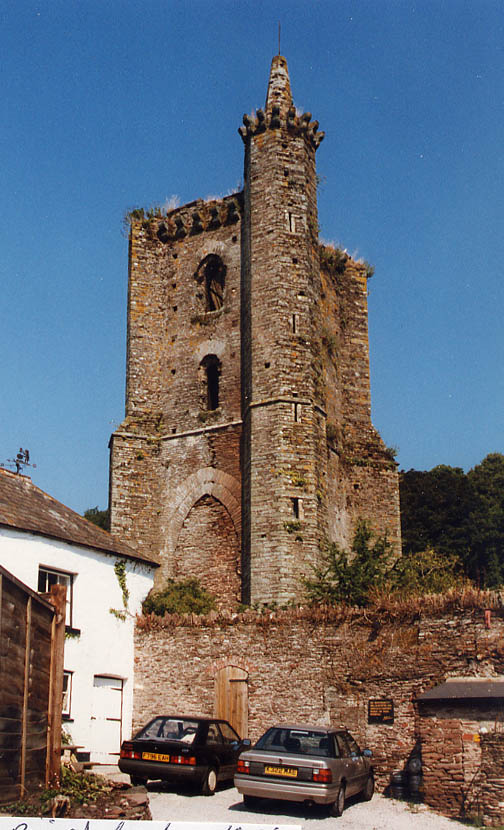
- Church tower

- Location within Devon
- Population: 434 (2011 census)
- Civil parish: Slapton
- District: South Hams
- Shire county: Devon
- Region: South West
- Country: England
- Sovereign state: United Kingdom

Slapton is a village and civil parish in the South Hams district of Devon, England. It is located near the A379 road between Kingsbridge and Dartmouth, and lies within the South Devon Area of Outstanding Natural Beauty (AONB). The nearby beach is Slapton Sands; despite its name, it is not a sandy beach but a shingle one.

In 1901 the population of the civil parish was 527, decreasing to 473 in 2001, and decreasing further to 434 at the 2011 census. The parish is surrounded clockwise from the north by the parishes of Blackawton, Strete, Stokenham and East Allington.

== History ==
Slapton was recorded in the Domesday Book of 1086 as Sladone. The Collegiate Chantry of St Mary was founded in 1372 or 1373 by Sir Guy de Brian. The Tower Inn and West tower remain and the tower has been designated by English Heritage as a grade I listed building. The Church of St James dates from the late 13th or early 14th century, and is also grade I listed.

The nearby beach is a coastal bar (see below), known as Slapton Sands. After Lalla Rookh, a tea clipper, was wrecked at Prawle Point in March 1873, some of her cargo of tea and tobacco, heaped up to 11 feet (3.4 m) high in places, as well as pieces of wreckage, were washed up on Slapton Sands. The beach itself is not sand, but consists of small smooth pebbles ranging in size from ¼ inch to several inches.

In 1944, during World War II, it was part of the site of Exercise Tiger, a rehearsal for the Invasion of Normandy which was attacked by German E-Boats and also saw a large number of friendly fire deaths. An M4A1 Sherman tank that was sunk in this action has been recovered and now stands on the road behind the beach at nearby Torcross. A stone memorial presented by the United States Army to the residents of South Hams also commemorates those who participated in the practice area for the Invasion of Normandy. The monument is accompanied by two flag poles either side. Part of Exercise Fabius took place a week after Exercise Tiger on Slapton Sands.

== Geography and environmental importance ==
Behind Slapton Sands is Slapton Ley, a nature reserve and example of serial or ecological succession — the process whereby open water becomes reed bed and eventually, as silt and leaf litter builds up, woodland. The beach itself is a bar: the material that makes up the beach was pushed up by the rising sea levels during the Flandrian transgression after the last glacial period (from 10,000 to 5,000 years ago). A similar process formed Chesil Beach.

Beaches formed like this are reworked by coastal processes now but are not supplied by enough material to recreate them, should material be removed. This had terrible consequences nearby at Hallsands where most of the beach was removed as building material for Devonport dockyards, leaving the village exposed to storms. It was struck by a storm in 1917 and most of the village was washed away, although no villagers were killed.

Further north, the beach is known as Strete Gate and at the northernmost end is Pilchard Cove. The southern end of the beach is known as Torcross Sands. A length of beach about 100 metres (110 yd) south of Pilchard Cove is regularly used by naturists. (Note: Location of Slapton nudist beach 50°18′08″N 3°37′59″W)

It was predicted in the 1990s that rising sea levels and coastal erosion would cause severe damage to Slapton, which is on the frontline for coastal harms, but no preparation was done; winter storms in early 2026 indeed caused much damage, including demolishing a section of the Slapton Line, a dramatic coastal road connecting Torcross and Slapton.

=== Climate ===
Climate data for Slapton (1991–2020 normals, extremes 1960-2023)
Month	Jan	Feb	Mar	Apr	May	Jun	Jul	Aug	Sep	Oct	Nov	Dec	Year
Record high °C (°F)	14.6 (58.3)	16.2 (61.2)	19.5 (67.1)	22.2 (72.0)	24.1 (75.4)	30.5 (86.9)	28.2 (82.8)	28.8 (83.8)	25.0 (77.0)	23.4 (74.1)	17.7 (63.9)	15.7 (60.3)	30.5 (86.9)
Mean daily maximum °C (°F)	9.5 (49.1)	9.6 (49.3)	11.0 (51.8)	13.2 (55.8)	16.0 (60.8)	18.8 (65.8)	20.9 (69.6)	20.8 (69.4)	18.7 (65.7)	15.6 (60.1)	12.4 (54.3)	10.2 (50.4)	14.8 (58.6)
Daily mean °C (°F)	6.8 (44.2)	6.7 (44.1)	8.0 (46.4)	9.6 (49.3)	12.2 (54.0)	14.9 (58.8)	16.8 (62.2)	16.9 (62.4)	15.1 (59.2)	12.5 (54.5)	9.4 (48.9)	7.4 (45.3)	11.4 (52.5)
Mean daily minimum °C (°F)	4.0 (39.2)	3.8 (38.8)	4.9 (40.8)	5.9 (42.6)	8.4 (47.1)	10.9 (51.6)	12.8 (55.0)	13.0 (55.4)	11.6 (52.9)	9.4 (48.9)	6.5 (43.7)	4.6 (40.3)	8.0 (46.4)
Record low °C (°F)	−8.0 (17.6)	−6.8 (19.8)	−6.5 (20.3)	−2.5 (27.5)	−0.1 (31.8)	2.5 (36.5)	6.2 (43.2)	6.0 (42.8)	3.9 (39.0)	−0.3 (31.5)	−2.7 (27.1)	−6.4 (20.5)	−8.0 (17.6)
Average precipitation mm (inches)	129.6 (5.10)	97.6 (3.84)	85.1 (3.35)	73.6 (2.90)	59.8 (2.35)	67.4 (2.65)	64.7 (2.55)	78.3 (3.08)	70.2 (2.76)	120.2 (4.73)	129.6 (5.10)	141.1 (5.56)	1,117.2 (43.98)
Average precipitation days (≥ 1.0 mm)	15.0	12.4	12.0	10.4	9.2	9.0	8.7	9.9	9.7	13.8	15.3	15.7	141.2
Mean monthly sunshine hours	56.3	88.1	122.5	178.9	212.0	215.6	209.2	191.8	151.3	103.6	72.0	48.6	1,649.8
Source 1: Met Office
Source 2: Starlings Roost Weather

== Gallery ==
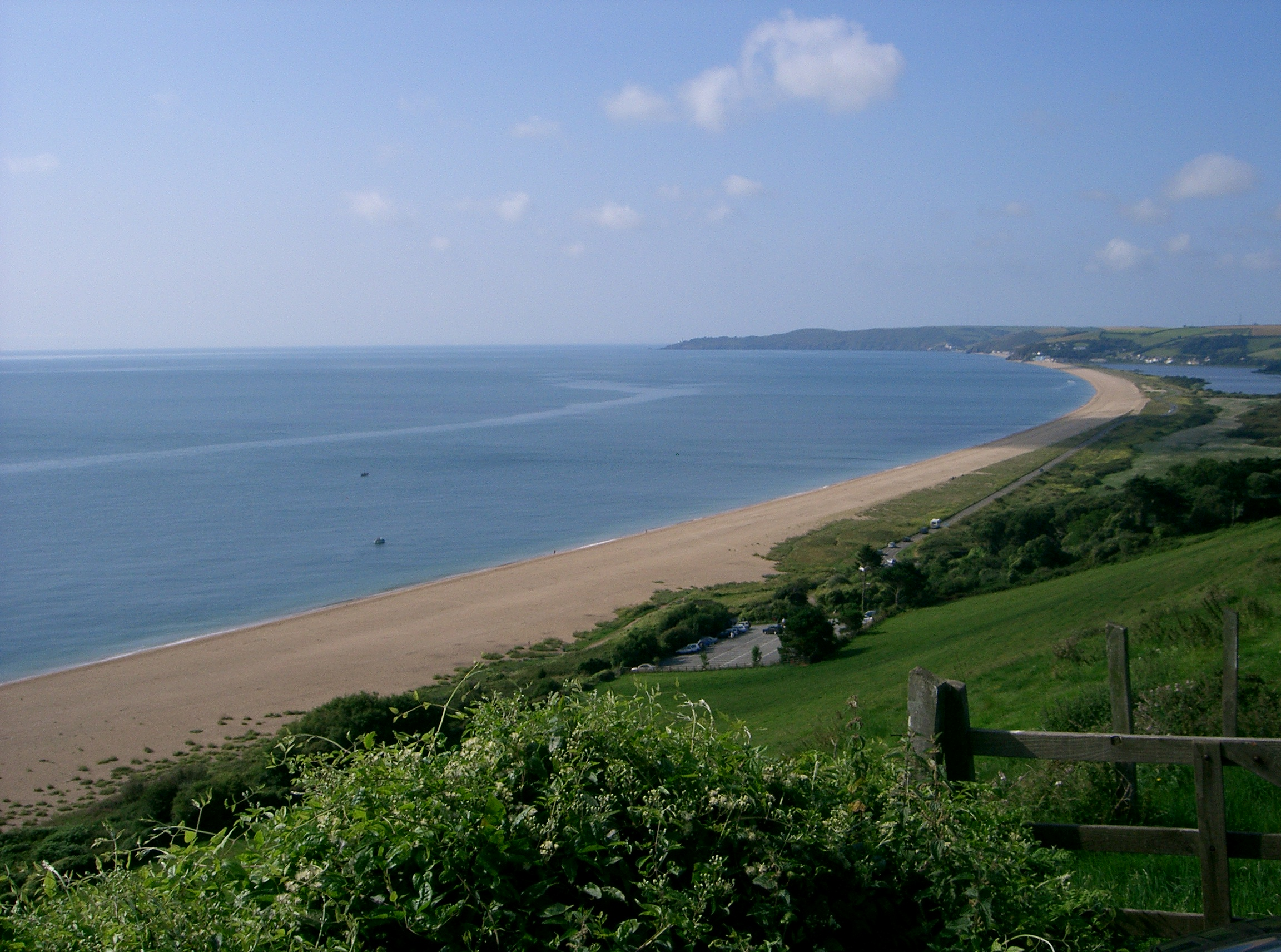
Slapton Sands

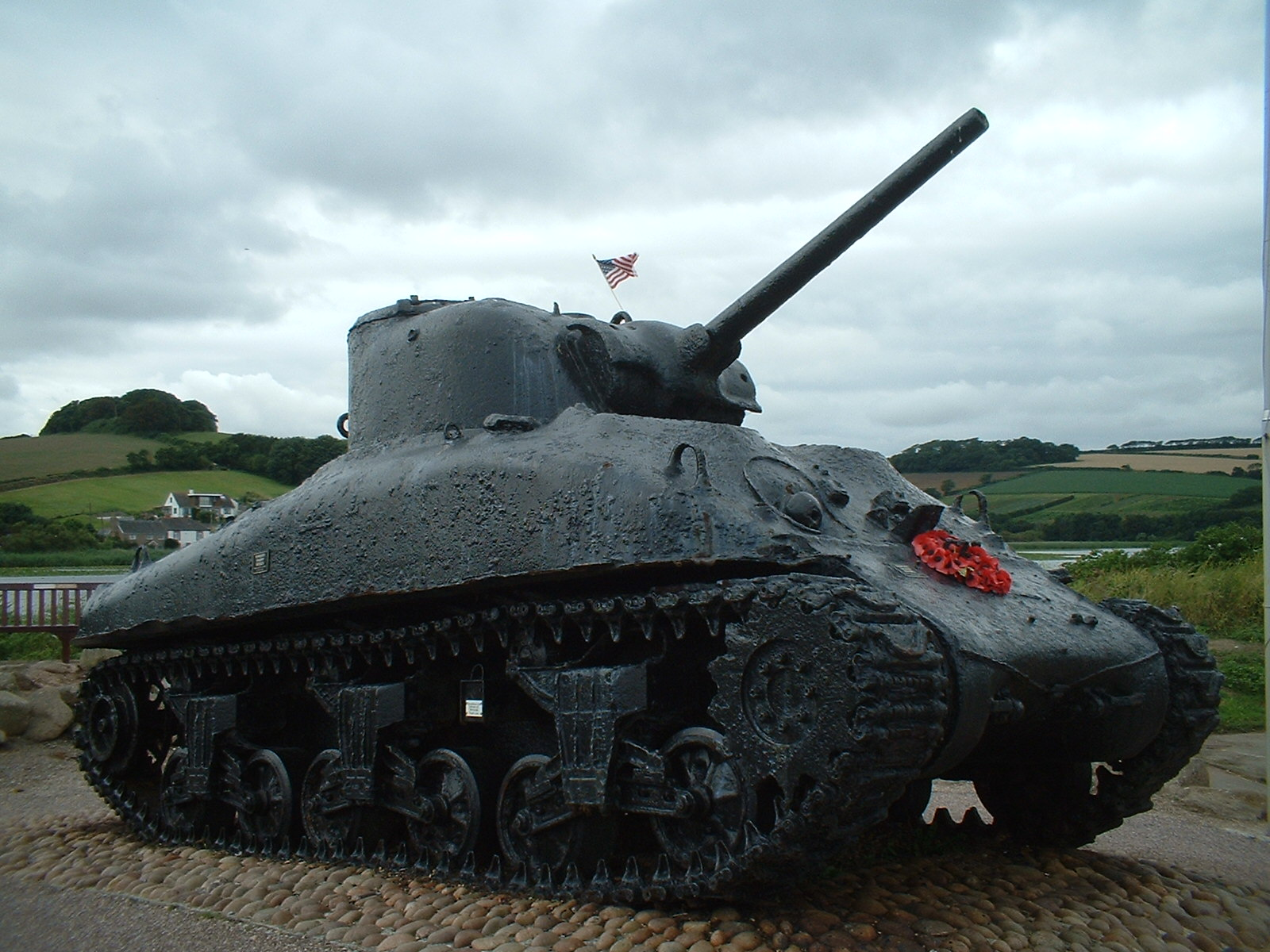
A Sherman tank at Slapton Sands, a memorial to those who died in Exercise Tiger

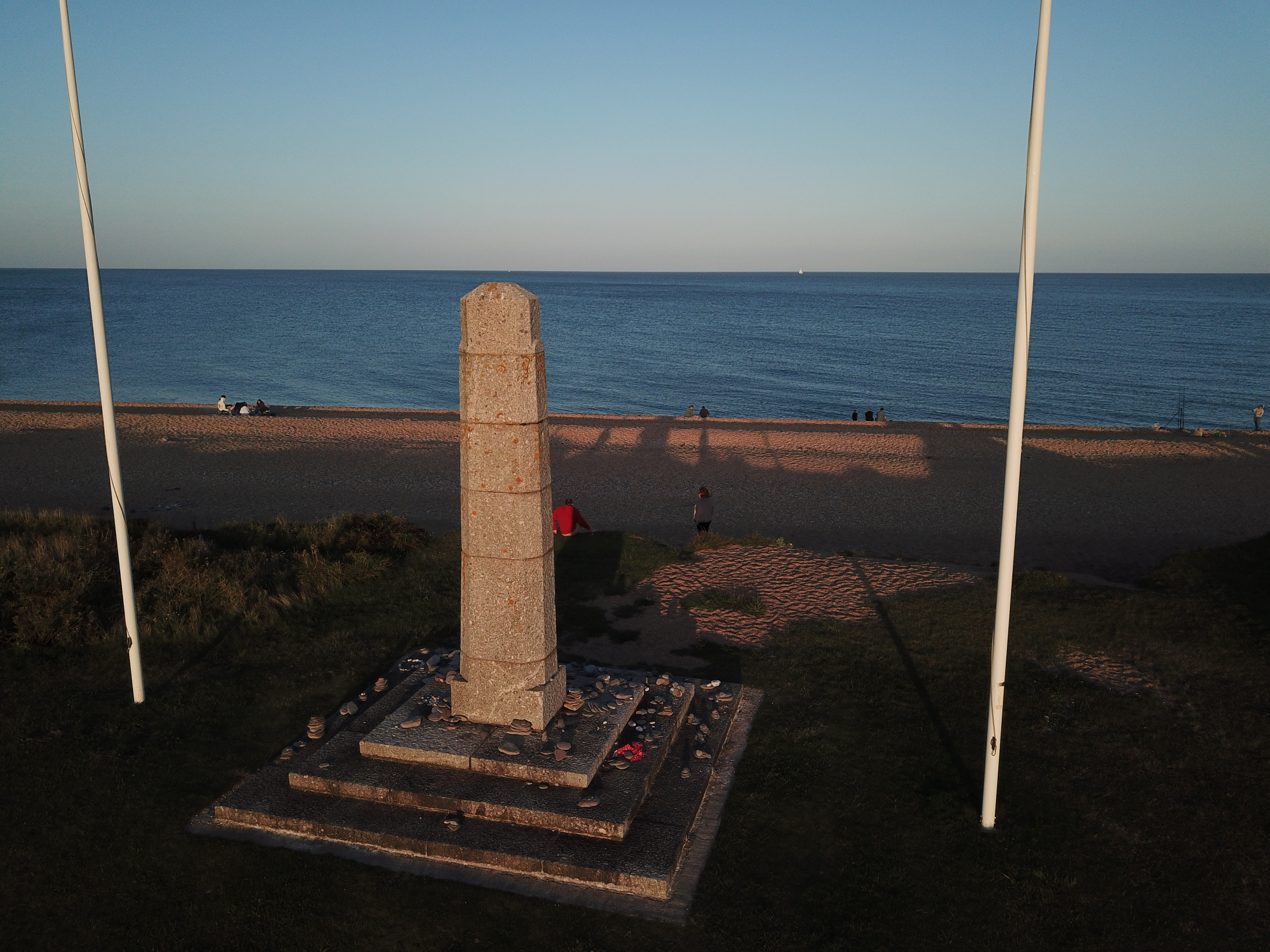
The stone memorial at Slapton Sands, presented by the US Army

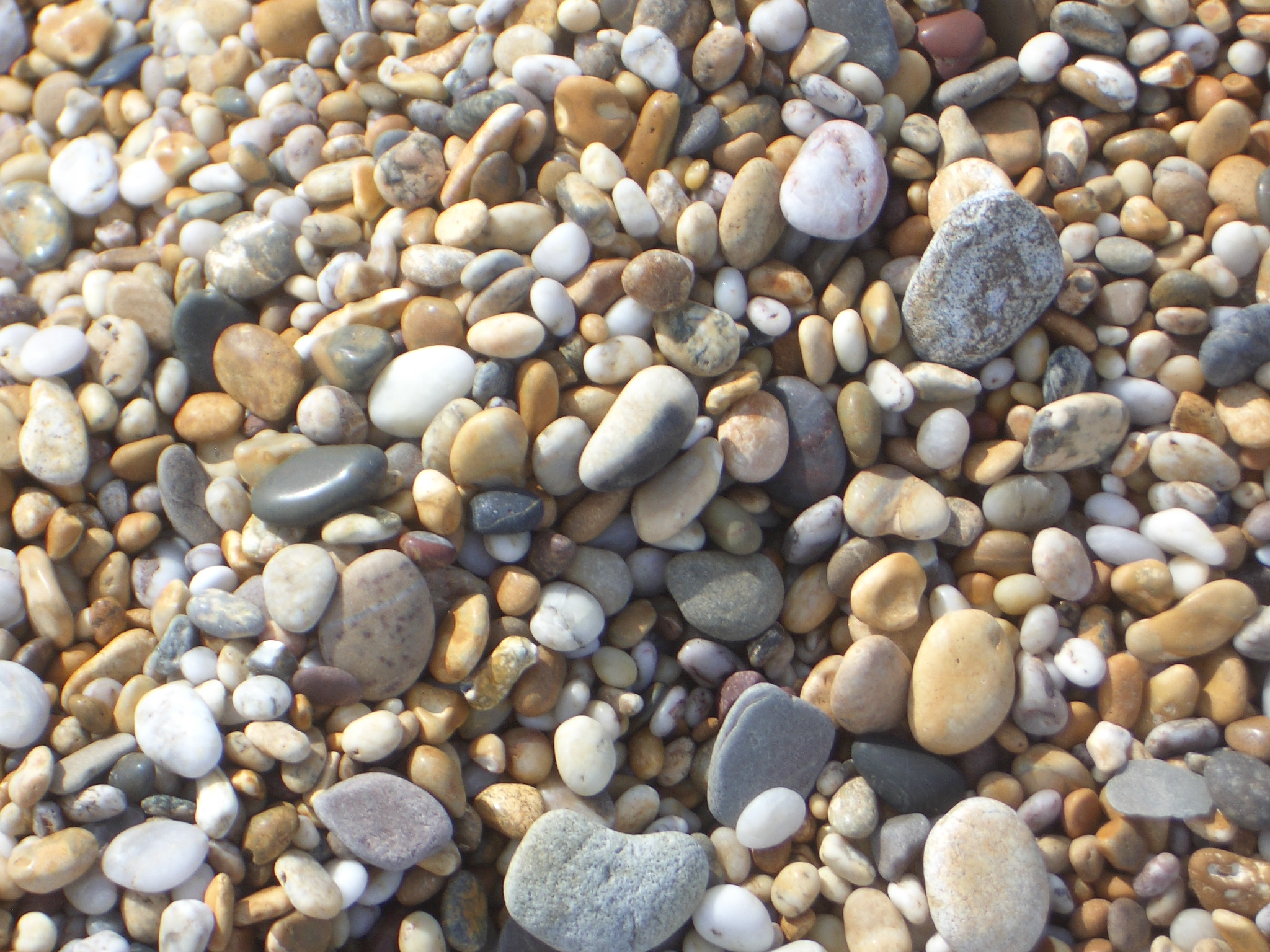
The 'sand' at Slapton Sands consists of small pebbles.

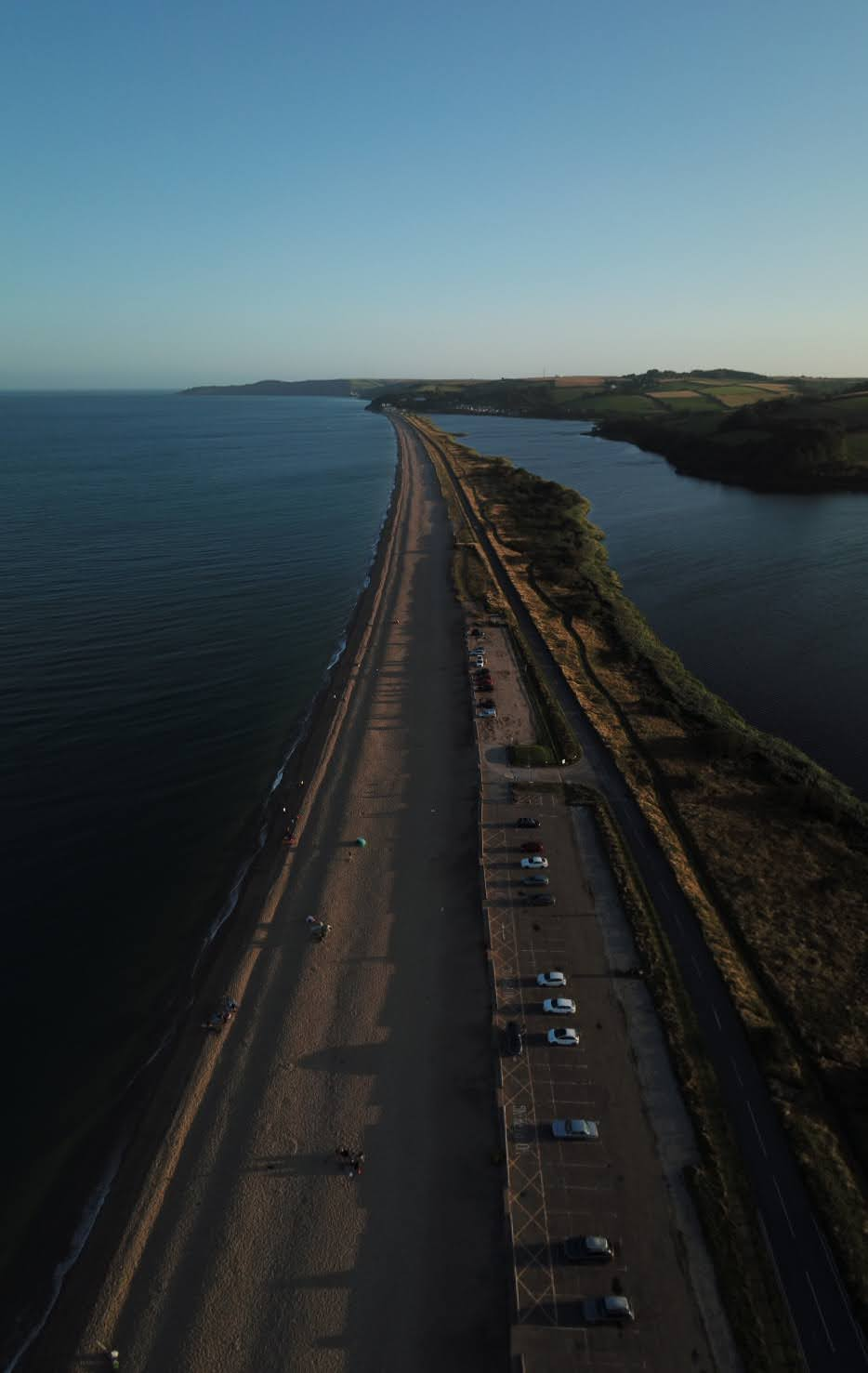
Aerial view of Slapton Sands, showing the car park and Slapton Ley.

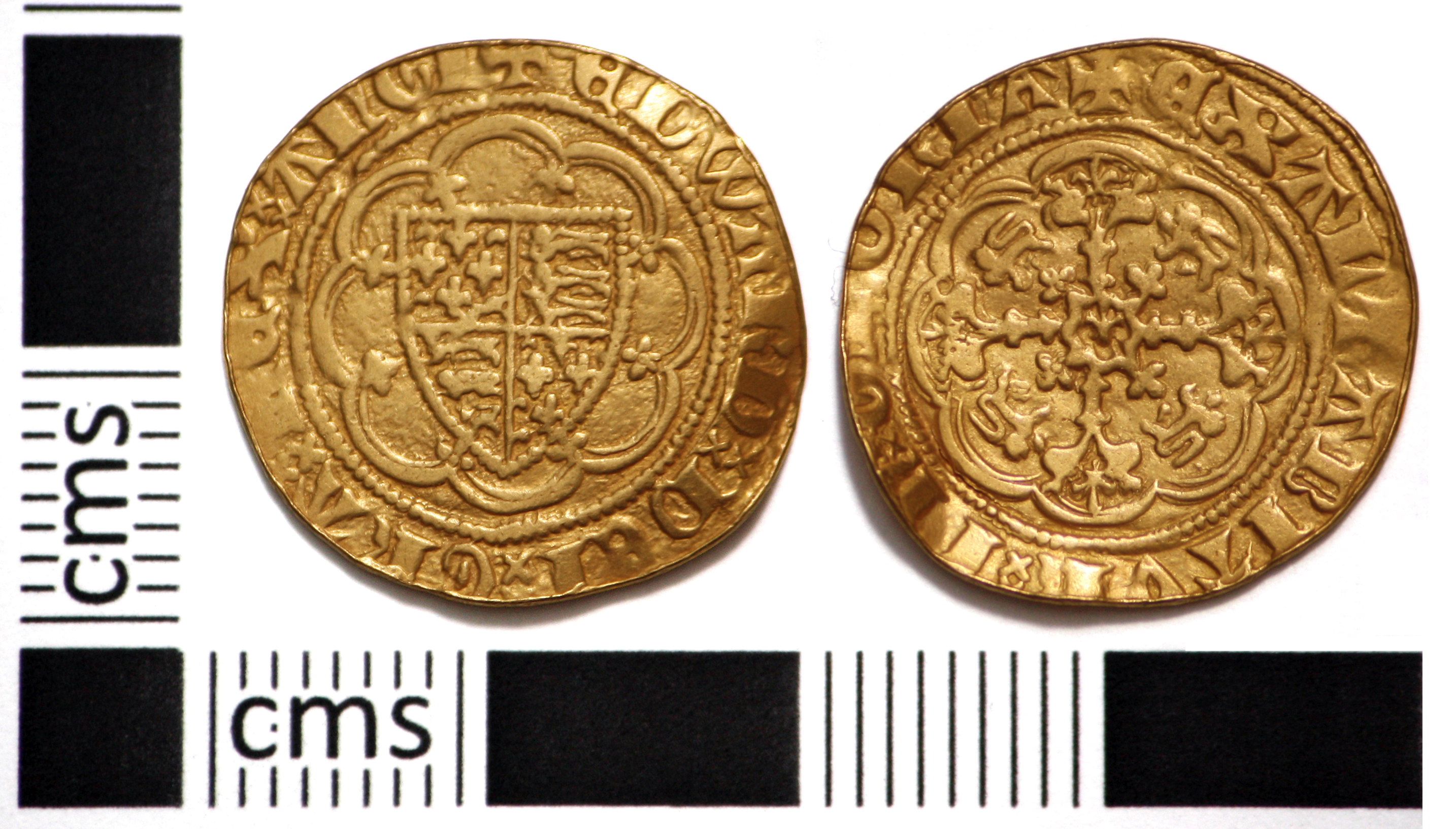
A gold quarter noble coin of Edward III, dating from c. 1363 – c. 1369, found in Slapton in 2015

== See also ==
- Exercise Tiger
- Slapton Castle
- Torcross
