= Chillington, Devon =

Village in Devon, England

Coordinates: 50.27014°N 3.69222°W

Chillington
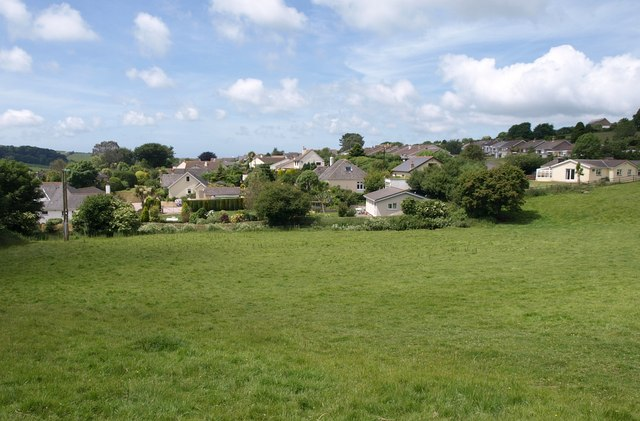
- Houses around Coleridge Lane in Chillington

- Location within Devon
- Population: 877
- OS grid reference: SX795425
- Civil parish: Stokenham
- District: South Hams
- Shire county: Devon
- Region: South West
- Country: England
- Sovereign state: United Kingdom
- Post town: KINGSBRIDGE
- Postcode district: TQ7
- Police: Devon and Cornwall
- Fire: Devon and Somerset
- Ambulance: South Western
- UK Parliament: South Devon

Chillington is a village in the Stokenham civil parish of South Hams in Devon, England, with a population of 877 as of the 2011 Census. It is located within and adjacent to the South Devon National Landscape, with a local economy which mainly serves residents, although it also has a healthcare centre which serves the surrounding area.
