= Torcross =

Village in south Devon, England

Coordinates: 50.26619°N 3.65420°W

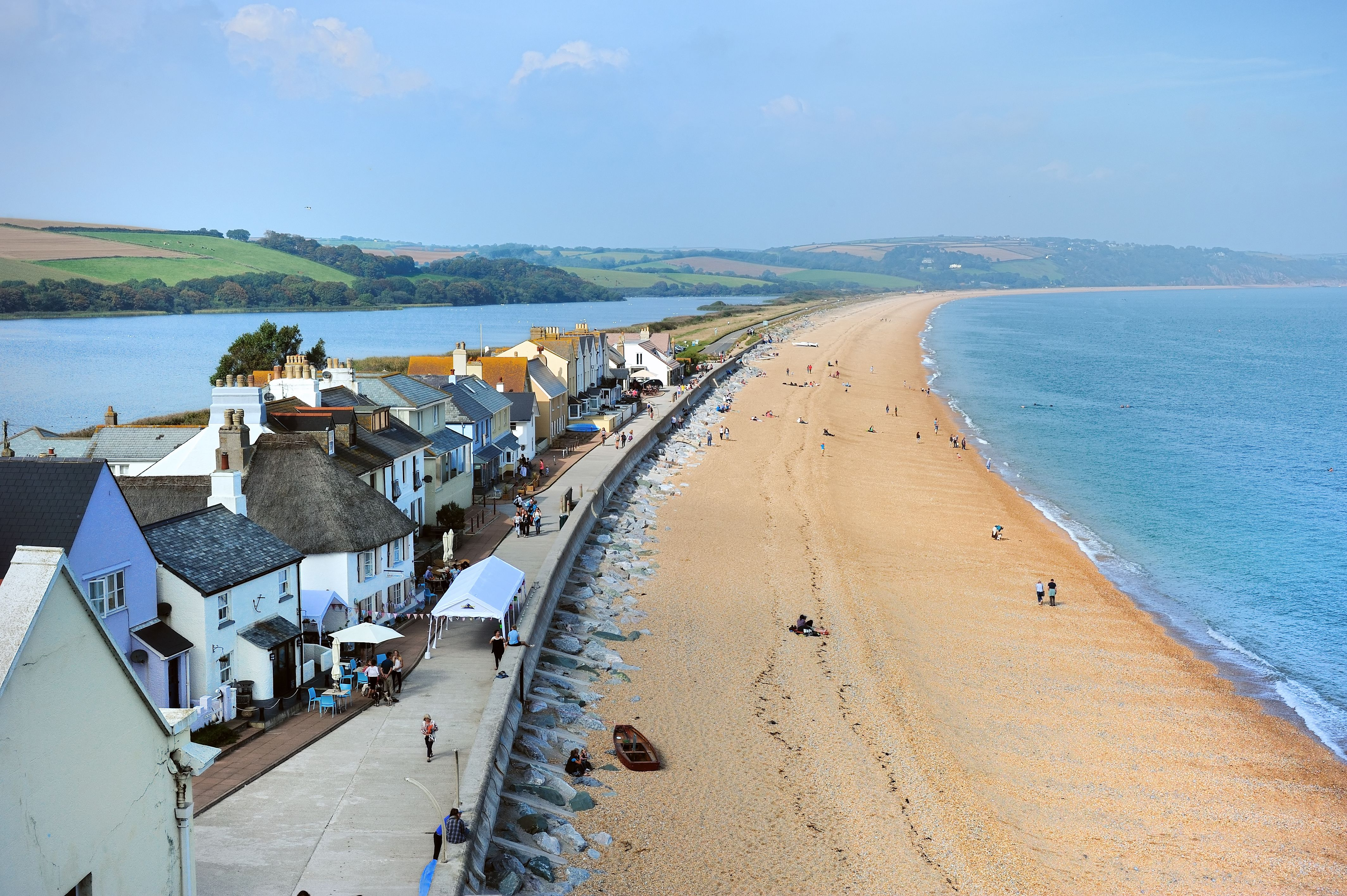
Looking down on Torcross and Slapton Sands from Torcross Point. Slapton Ley is visible behind the houses.

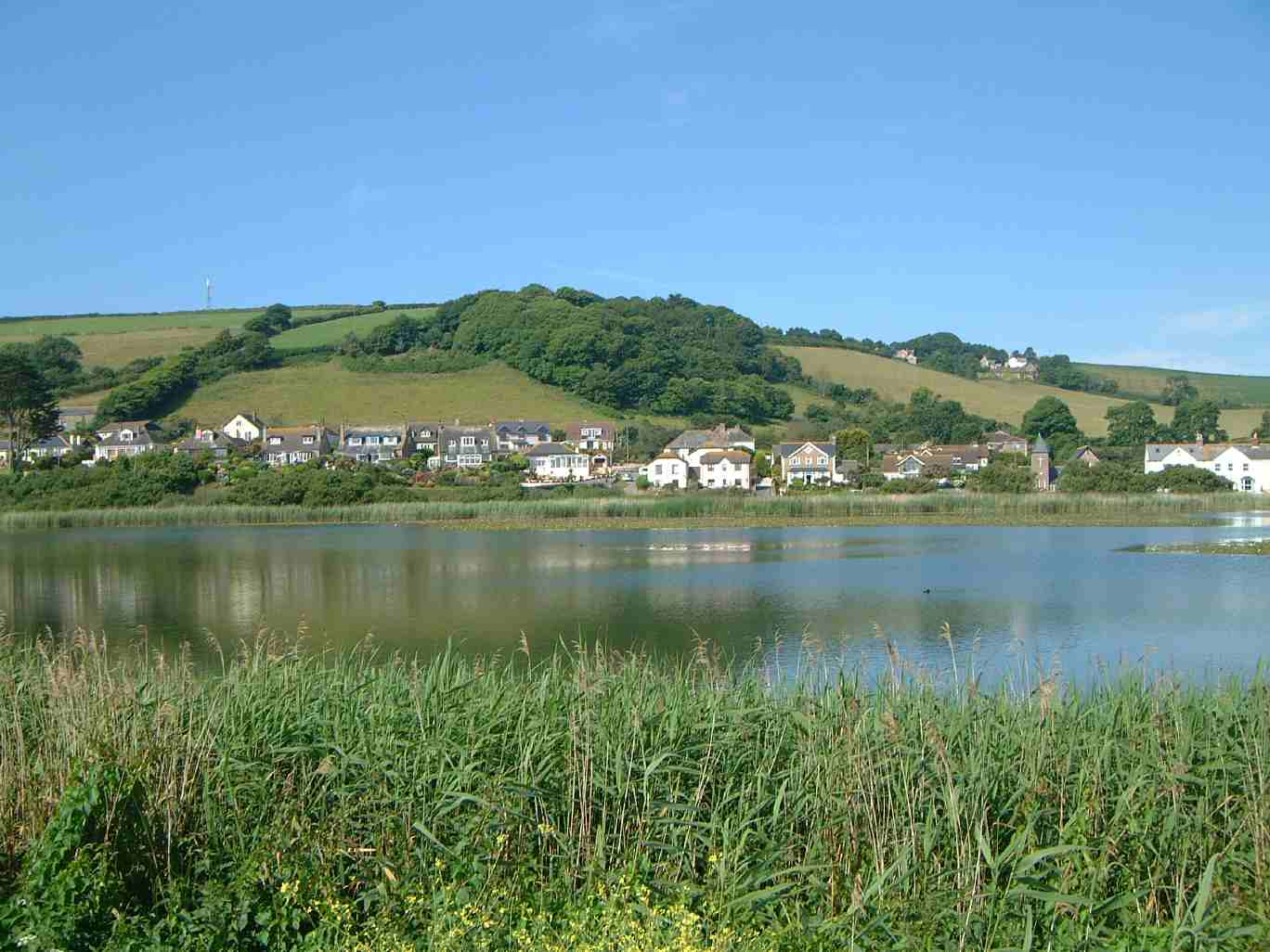
The "inland" part of Torcross seen from across Slapton Ley.

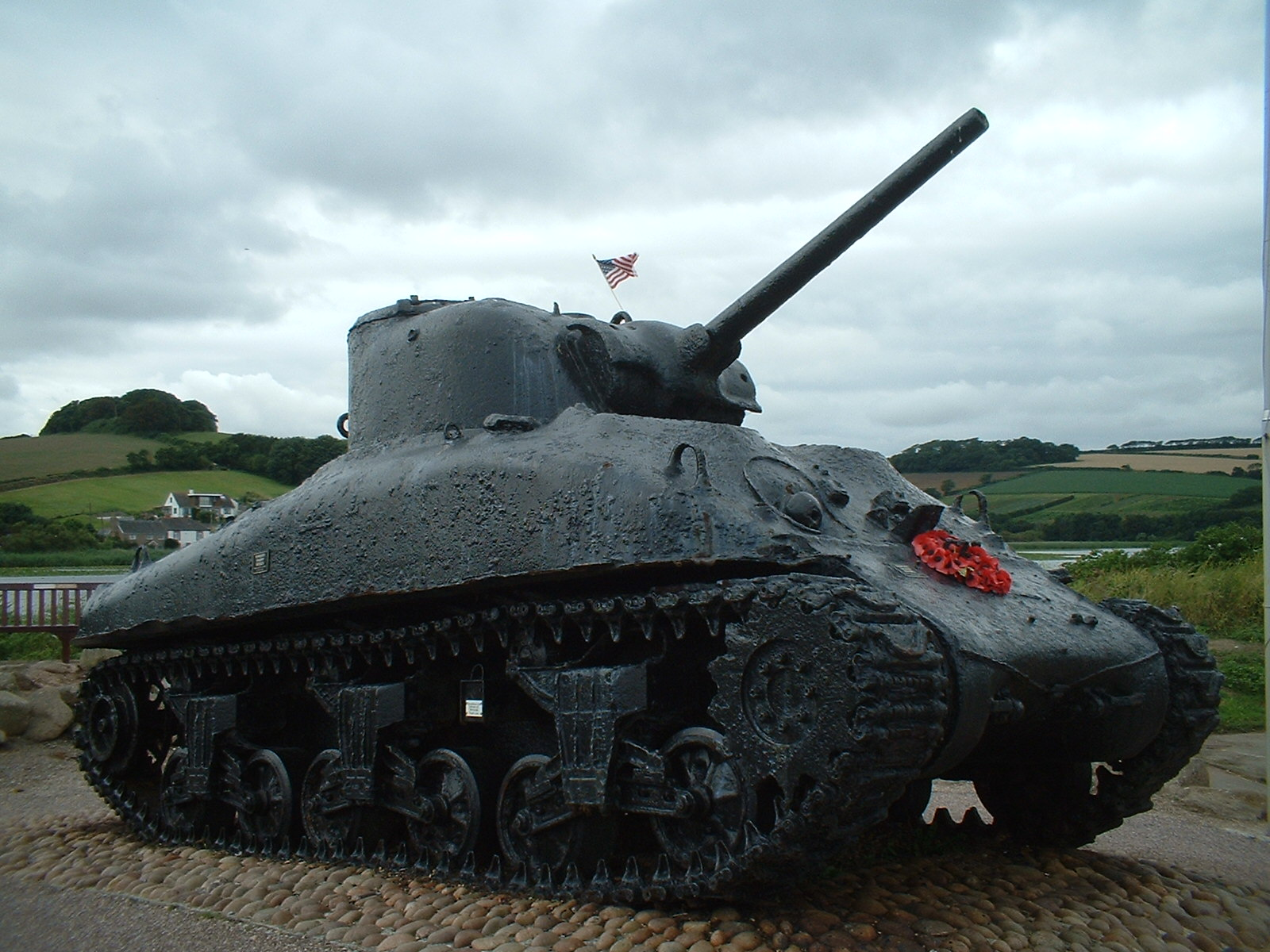
Salvaged Sherman M4A1 DD tank from Operation Tiger

Torcross is a seaside village in the South Hams district of south Devon in England. It stands at grid reference SX822420 at the southern end of Slapton Sands, a narrow strip of land and shingle beach which separates the freshwater lake of Slapton Ley from Start Bay and carries the A379 coastal road north to Dartmouth.

== Early history ==
The first mention of Torcross was recorded at the manorial court in the court rolls of 29 March 1602 when it was recorded that a representative of the new village reported that everything was "all well". In 1854 the coastal road between Kingsbridge and Dartmouth was built passing through Torcross giving a much needed lifeline to the community. In 1858 a coach service started between Dartmouth and Kingsbridge.

== WW2 evacuation and Exercise Tiger ==
In late 1943 Torcross was evacuated, along with many other villages in the South Hams area, to make way for 15,000 allied troops who needed the area to practise for the D-Day landings.

In the early hours of 28 April 1944 a tragic incident happened during Exercise Tiger: nine German torpedo boats (Schnellboote), alerted by heavy radio traffic, intercepted a three-mile-long convoy of vessels travelling from the Isle of Portland to Slapton Sands to undertake landing rehearsals for D Day. Two Tank landing ships (LST) were sunk in the engagement and 946 American servicemen died. Poor communications led to badly-timed shelling on the beach, killing about 300 more men. Over 1,000 lives were lost over the course of the operation, most of them through US Army friendly fire.

A Sherman amphibious tank and several plaques stand at Torcross car park between Slapton Ley and the beach as memorials to the men who lost their lives. The operation to salvage the tank from the shallow waters of Start Bay was financed by Ken Small, a Torcross hotelier, and was completed in 1984.

== Storms and coastal erosion ==
Over the years Torcross has survived a battering from some terrible storms. On 4 January 1979 enormous waves washed over the roofs of the dwellings causing substantial damage to all the buildings along the then beach front; in the aftermath lorry-loads of boulders were brought in from the Plymouth area as temporary protection and a new curved seawall was built. On 11 and 12 January 2001 another bad storm caused the loss of up to five metres of the beachhead along a stretch of beach about 1000 metres long. Part of the A379 road along Slapton Sands near Slapton village was also destroyed; it was not reopened for three months after being rerouted. 3,000 tons of boulders were initially used to protect the road, but were later removed because of damage to the Slapton Ley SSSI.

The maintenance of the road is vital to Torcross as it is the main access route to Dartmouth for the villagers and local businesses. South Hams District Council is working to keep the A379 from being eroded, realigning the road and importing shingle from parts of Slapton Sands that have a surplus. A study by Natural England after the 2001 storm confirmed that because of the reduction in the amount of shingle available and the increasing frequency of storms, coupled with a predicted 30 to 40 cm rise in sea level over the next 50 years, Slapton Sands is retreating and will continue to retreat.

On Tuesday and Wednesday 4 and 5 February 2014 a storm caused extensive damage to the properties along the promenade with the sea entering all properties except one on the night of 4 February. The buildings were hit by green water that came over the sea wall and large shingle also hit them. The road was also covered with the beach and became unpassable. Another storm on the night of Friday 14 February resulted in thousands of tonnes of the beach being washed onto the beach road, 4 people had to be rescued from their cars that were washed off the road, the coastguards undertaking the rescue also got their vehicle stuck on the unpassable beach road.

In January 2015, some 27,000 tonnes of shingle was moved from further up the beach at a cost of £250,000 to strengthen the sea defences this was washed away by the next high tide. During February 2016 the sea wall collapsed beyond the easternmost buildings, which resulted in the road being closed. Also the concrete promenade began to crack along its length.

== See also ==
- Exercise Tiger
- Hallsands, a nearby village that was destroyed by the sea in 1917.
