= Exercise Tiger =

D-Day rehearsal in 1944

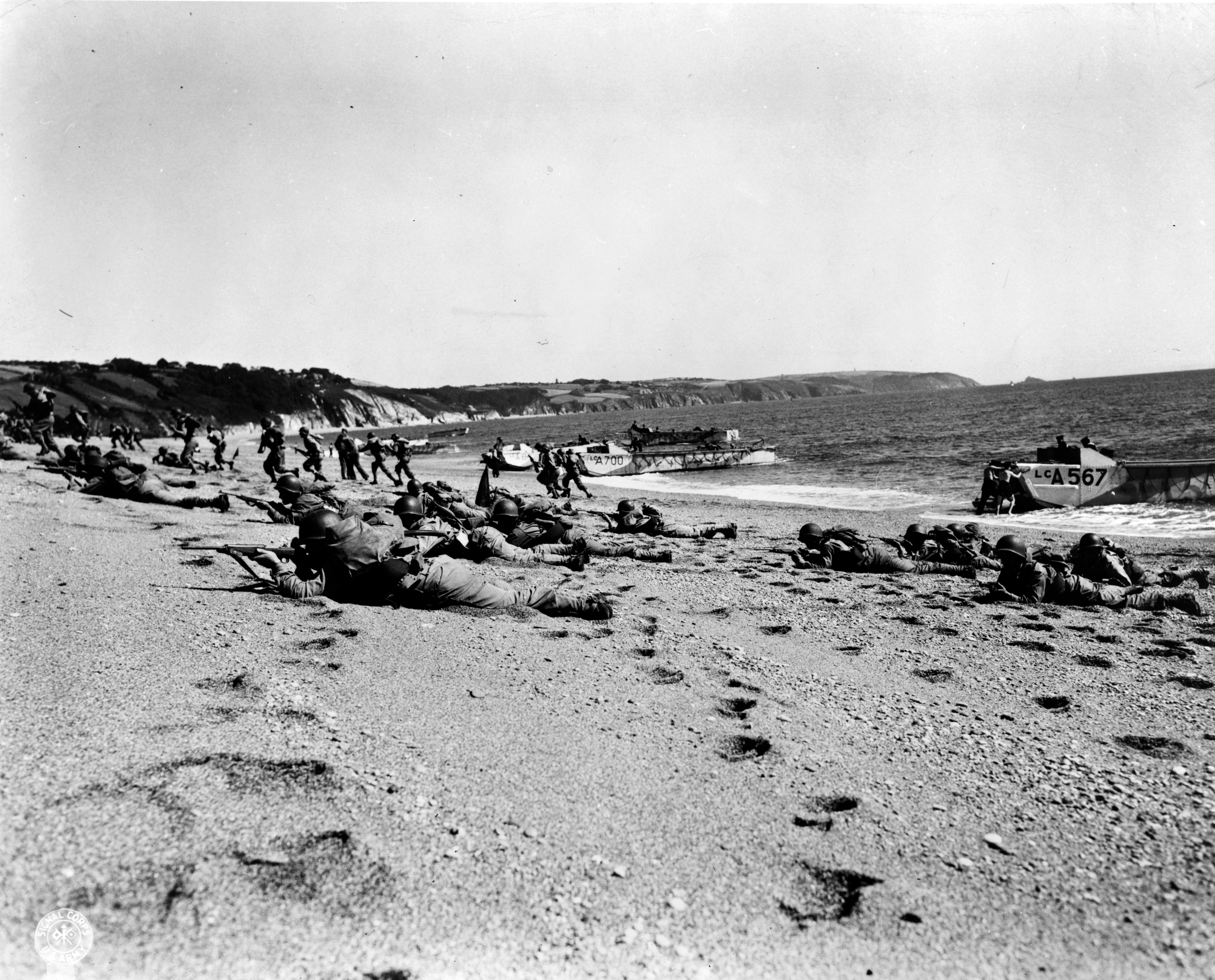
American troops landing on Slapton Sands in England during rehearsals for the invasion of Normandy

Exercise Tiger, or Operation Tiger, was one of the rehearsals for the D-Day invasion of Normandy. Held in April 1944 on Slapton Sands in Devon, it proved fraught with difficulties. Coordination and communication problems resulted in friendly fire injuries during the exercise, and an Allied convoy preparing for the landing was attacked by E-boats of Nazi Germany's Kriegsmarine, resulting in the deaths of at least 749 American servicemen. Because of the impending invasion of Normandy, the incident was kept secret and was only minimally reported afterwards.

== Exercise ==
=== Landing operations ===
In late 1943, as part of the build-up to D-Day, the British government set up a training ground at Slapton Sands, Devon, to be used by Force "U", the American forces tasked with landing on Utah Beach. Slapton Beach was selected for its similarity to Utah Beach: a gravel beach, followed by a strip of land and then a lake. Approximately 3,000 local residents in the area of Slapton, now South Hams District of Devon, were evacuated. Some had never left their villages before being evacuated.

Landing exercises started in December 1943. Exercise Tiger was one of the larger exercises that took place in April and May 1944. The exercise was to last from 22 April until 30 April 1944, and covered all aspects of the invasion, culminating in a beach landing at Slapton Sands. On board nine large tank landing ships (LSTs), the 30,000 troops prepared for their mock landing, which also included a live-firing exercise.

Protection for the exercise area came from the Royal Navy. Four O-class destroyers, three Motor Torpedo Boats and two Motor Gun Boats patrolled the entrance to Lyme Bay while three Motor Torpedo Boats were stationed off Cherbourg, where German E-boats were based.

The first phase of the exercise focused on marshalling and embarkation drills, and lasted from 22 to 25 April. On the evening of 26 April the first wave of assault troops boarded their transports and set off, the plan being to simulate the Channel crossing by taking a roundabout route through Lyme Bay, in order to arrive off Slapton at first light on 27 April.

=== Friendly fire incident ===
The first practice assault took place on the morning of 27 April and was marked by an incident involving friendly fire. H-hour was set for 07:30, and was to include live ammunition to acclimatise the troops to the sights, sounds and even smells of a naval bombardment. During the landing itself, live rounds were to be fired over the heads of the incoming troops by forces on land, for the same reason. This followed an order made by General Dwight D. Eisenhower, the Supreme Allied Commander, who felt that the men must be hardened by exposure to realistic battle conditions. The exercise was to include naval bombardment by ships of Force U Bombardment Group fifty minutes prior to the landing.

Several of the landing ships for that morning were delayed, and the officer in charge, American Admiral Don P. Moon, decided to delay H-hour for 60 minutes, until 08:30. Some of the landing craft did not receive word of the change. Landing on the beach at their originally scheduled time, the second wave came under fire, suffering an unknown number of casualties. Rumours circulated among the fleet that as many as 450 men were killed.

== Battle of Lyme Bay ==
Battle of Lyme Bay
- Part of World War II
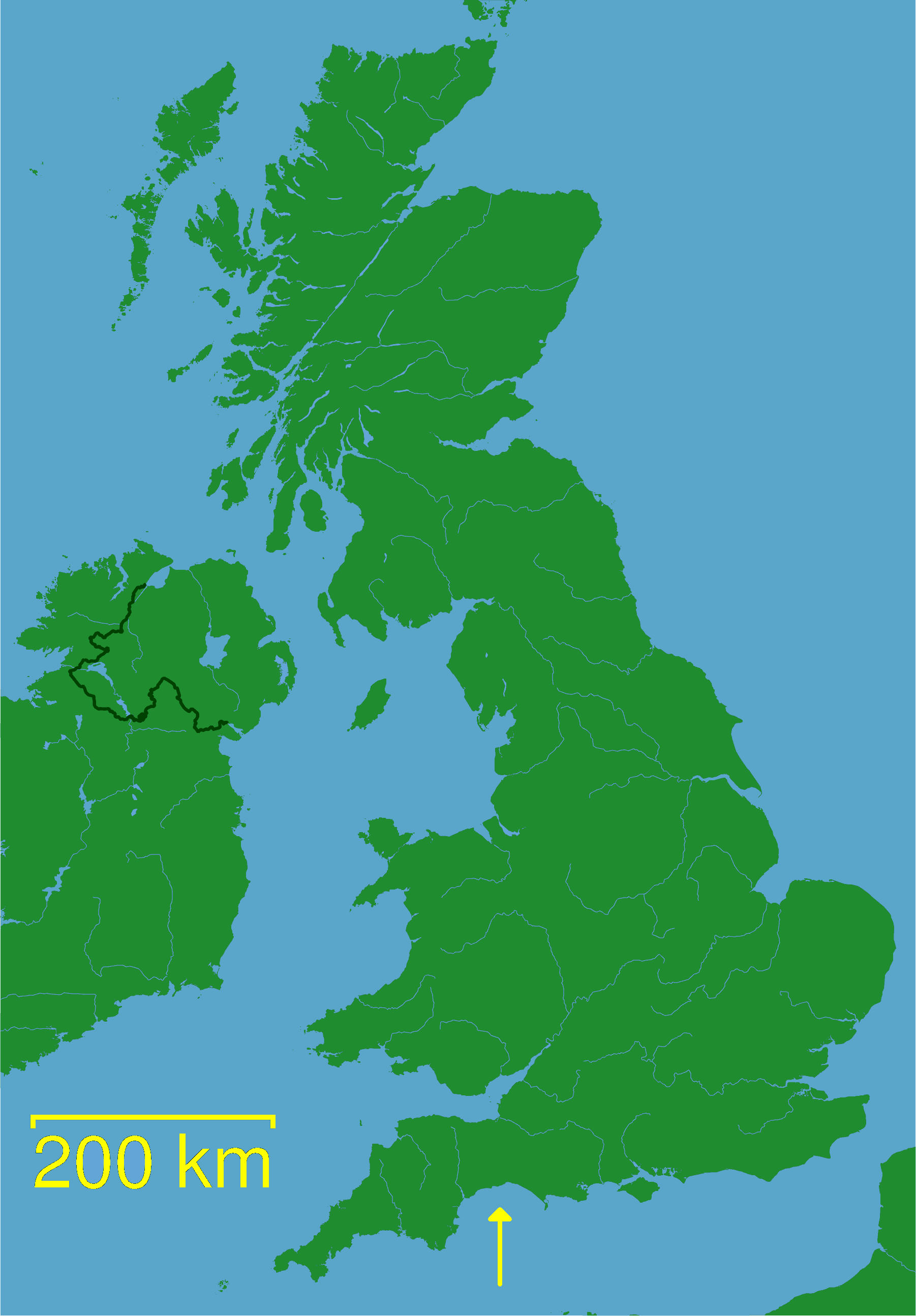
- Arrow shows Lyme Bay in south-west England
Date	28 April 1944
Location	off Portland, England, Lyme Bay, English Channel 50.28°N 3.64750°W
Result	German victory

Belligerents
United States; United Kingdom	Germany

Strength
1 corvette 8 LSTs	9 E-boats

Casualties and losses
749 killed ~200 wounded 2 LSTs sunk 2 LSTs damaged	none

On the day after the first practice assaults, early on the morning of 28 April, the exercise was blighted when Convoy T-4, consisting of eight LSTs carrying vehicles and combat engineers of the 1st Engineer Special Brigade, was attacked by German E-boats in Lyme Bay. (Note: One of these E-Boats was S-130, now in dry dock in Plymouth, Devon.) Nine German E-boats had left Cherbourg shortly after midnight, avoiding the British MTBs watching the port area and patrols in the English Channel.

At around 01:30, six E-boats of the 5. S-Boot Flottille (5th E-Boat Flotilla) commanded by Korvettenkapitän Bernd Klug saw eight dark ships and split into three pairs to attack with torpedoes: first Rotte 3 (S-136 & S-138), then Rotte 2 under Oberleutnant zur See Goetschke (S-140 & S-142), then Rotte 1 (S-100 & S-143). The final three E-boats of the nine, S-Boot Flottille commanded by Korvettenkapitän Götz Freiherr von Mirbach (S-130, S-145 & S-150), saw the red flares for attack (or may have heard the contact report sent at 02:03) and joined the attack. Within the Rotte 1 pair, S-100 collided with S-143, damaged its superstructure, and the boats decided to leave, masking their retreat with smoke while sending another contact report. S-145 attacked the ships with gunfire. The attack ended at circa 03:30. The Germans had been puzzled by the strange-looking ships which did not look like merchantmen. They estimated that they were some type of American landing ship with a shallow draft, as the initial torpedoes from Rotte 3 and Rotte 2 seemed to miss.

Of the two ships assigned to protect the convoy, only one was present. HMS Azalea, a corvette, was leading the LSTs in a straight line, a formation that later drew criticism since it presented an easy target to the E-boats. The second ship that was supposed to be present, HMS Scimitar, a World War I destroyer, had been in a collision with an LST, suffered structural damage and left the convoy to be repaired at Plymouth. Because the LSTs and British naval headquarters were operating on different frequencies, the American forces did not know this. HMS Saladin was dispatched as a replacement, but did not arrive in time to help protect the convoy.

=== Casualties ===
- LST-289 was set on fire but eventually made it back to shore with the loss of 13 Navy personnel.
- LST-507 was torpedoed and sunk with the loss of 202 US Army/Navy personnel.
- LST-511 was damaged by friendly fire from LST-496 (intended to be directed at one of the E-boats which passed between the two LSTs) resulting in injuries to 18 US Army/Navy personnel.
- LST-531 sank within six minutes of being torpedoed with the loss of 424 Army and Navy personnel.

The remaining ships and their escort fired back and the E-boats made no more attacks. In total, 749 servicemen (551 United States Army and 198 United States Navy) were killed during Exercise Tiger. Many servicemen drowned or died of hypothermia in the cold sea while waiting to be rescued. Many had not been shown how to put on their lifebelt correctly, and placed it around their waist, the only available spot because of their large backpacks. In some cases this meant that when they jumped into the water, the weight of their combat packs flipped them upside down, dragging their heads under water and drowning them. Dale Rodman, who travelled on LST-507, commented: "The worst memory I have is setting off in the lifeboat away from the sinking ship and watching bodies float by". The 248 bodies that were recovered were sent to Brookwood Cemetery in Surrey on 29 April. The unit with the most casualties was the 1st Engineer Special Brigade.

== Aftermath ==
=== Operational consequences ===
Vice Admiral Kirk of the US Navy immediately realised the huge damage E-boats could inflict on slow-moving landing craft with minimal defences and feared that the German success in Lyme Bay could be repeated on D-Day, with disastrous consequences. On 4 May 1944 he sent a signal to Admiral Ramsay of the Royal Navy arguing for heavy aerial and naval bombardment of Cherbourg:

In my opinion the E-boats must be destroyed or driven from the Cherbourg area, prior to D-Day. The only successful defense against the E-boat is to sink it before it can reach an attack position.

— Vice Admiral Kirk

=== Other consequences ===
The attack was reported to Eisenhower on 29 April. Eisenhower was enraged that the convoy was sailing in a straight line and not zig-zagging, that the attack reduced reserves of LSTs, that it indicated to the Germans that the Allies were nearly ready to invade, and that ten American officers with knowledge of the invasion were missing. Each had BIGOT clearance for D-Day, giving them knowledge that could have compromised the invasion should they have been captured alive. As a result, D-Day was nearly called off while Eisenhower's order to find the missing bodies and any incriminating papers they might have had was carried out. All ten were recovered.

The ten American officers were from the 1st Engineer Special Brigade; they knew when and where the Utah and Omaha landings were to take place, and had seen the amphibious DUKWs that were to take the Rangers to below Pointe du Hoc. Merely knowing that exercises were taking place at Slapton was of interest to the Germans; the historian Stephen Ambrose suggests that the insistence in May by Hitler that the Normandy area be reinforced was because "he noticed the similarity between Slapton Sands and the Cotentin beach".

There were reports that E-boats were nosing through the wreckage for information with searchlights or torches. The shore batteries around nearby Salcombe Harbour had visually spotted unidentified small craft, but were ordered not to fire on them as it would have shown the Germans that the harbour was defended and disclosed the battery position.

As a result of official embarrassment and concerns over potential leaks just prior to the real invasion, all survivors were sworn to secrecy about the events by their superiors. There is little information about exactly how individual soldiers and sailors died. The US Department of Defense stated in 1988 that record-keeping may have been inadequate aboard some of the ships, and the most pertinent log books were lost at sea. A ninth LST (LST-508) was scheduled to be in the convoy, but was damaged. Author Nigel Lewis speculates that some or all of its infantrymen may have been aboard LST 507 when it went down. Various eyewitness accounts detail hasty treatment of casualties, and rumours circulated of unmarked mass graves in Devon fields.

Several changes resulted from mistakes made in Exercise Tiger:

1. Radio frequencies were standardised; Azalea and Scimitar were late and out of position due to radio problems, and a signal about the E-boats' presence was not picked up by the LSTs.
2. Better lifejacket training was provided for landing troops.
3. Plans were made for small craft to pick up floating survivors on D-Day.

Official histories contain little information about the tragedy. Some commentators have called it a cover-up, but protecting the secrecy of the Normandy landings was paramount, and the urgencies created by the invasion spread non-critical resources thin. In his book The Forgotten Dead: Why 946 American Servicemen Died Off The Coast Of Devon In 1944 – And The Man Who Discovered Their True Story, published in 1988, Ken Small declares that the event "was never covered up; it was 'conveniently forgotten'".

The casualty statistics from Tiger were not released by Supreme Headquarters Allied Expeditionary Force (SHAEF) until August 1944, along with the casualties of the actual D-Day landings. This report stated that there were 442 army dead and 197 navy, for a total of 639. (However, Moon had reported on 30 April that there were 749 dead.) Charles B. MacDonald, author and former deputy chief historian at the U.S. Army Center of Military History, notes that information from the SHAEF press release appeared in the August issue of Stars and Stripes. MacDonald surmises that the press release went largely unnoticed in light of the larger events that were occurring at the time. The story was detailed in at least three books at the end of the war, including Captain Harry C. Butcher's My Three Years With Eisenhower (1946), and in several publications and speeches.

=== Memorials ===
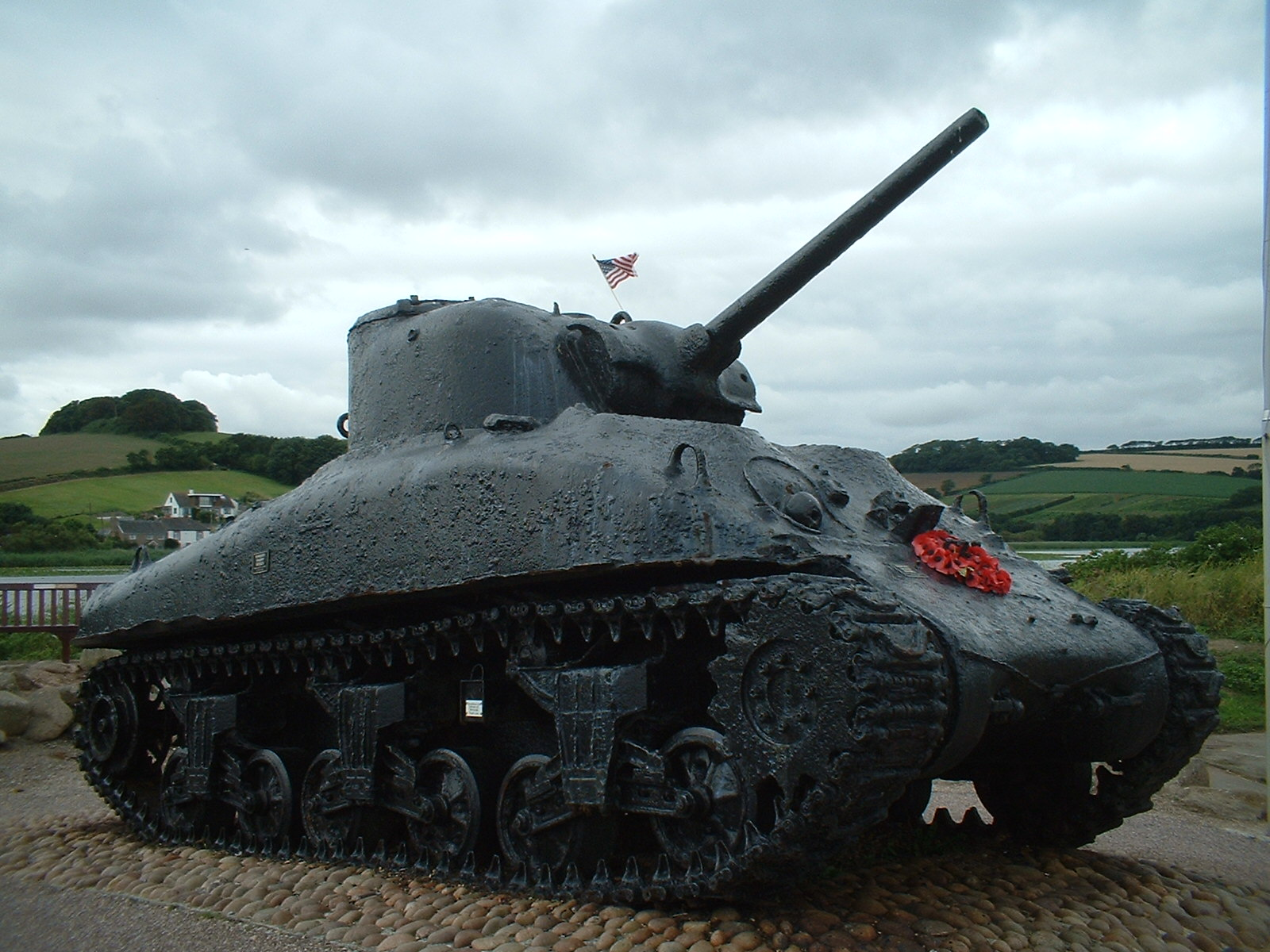
Sherman DD tank at the Torcross memorial in South Devon.

Devon resident and civilian Ken Small took on the task of seeking to commemorate the event, after discovering evidence of the aftermath washed up on the shore while beachcombing in the early 1970s.

In 1974, Small bought from the U.S. Government the rights to a submerged tank from the 70th Tank Battalion discovered in his search. In 1984, with the aid of local residents and diving firms, he raised the tank, which now stands as a memorial to the incident. The local authority provided a plinth on the seafront to put the tank on, and erected a plaque in memory of the men killed. The American military honoured and supported him.

The Slapton Sands memorial plaque reads, in part:

Dedicated by the United States of America in honor of the men of the US Army's 1st Engineer Special Brigade, the 4th Infantry Division, and the VII Corps Headquarters; and the US Navy's 11th Amphibious Force who perished in the waters of Lyme Bay during the early hours of April 28, 1944.

In 2013, the memorial was expanded with a plaque naming all the victims of Exercise Tiger.

A plaque was erected in 1995 at Arlington National Cemetery entitled "Exercise Tiger Memorial". In 1997, the Exercise Tiger Association established a memorial to veterans of the exercise in Mexico, Missouri. It is a 2,300-kilogram (5,000 lb) stern anchor from an LST of the Suffolk County Class on permanent loan from the Navy.

In 2012, a memorial plaque was erected at Utah Beach, Normandy, on the wall of a former German anti-aircraft bunker.

An M4 Sherman tank stands as a memorial to Exercise Tiger at Fort Rodman Park in New Bedford, Massachusetts.

In 2019, the US servicemen who died in the exercise were remembered in an art installation by artist Martin Barraud. Bootprints of 749 troops were laid out on Slapton Sands to mark the 75th anniversary of Exercise Tiger. Commemorative bootprints and special plaques made by veterans to represent each of the 22,763 British and Commonwealth servicemen and women who were killed on D-Day and during the Battle of Normandy in the summer of 1944 were sold. Barraud said:

Our enduring hope is that every one of the US, British and Commonwealth soldiers, sailors and airmen who gave their lives will have a bootprint purchased in their memory.

== In popular culture ==
- Someone In Time by Stuart Cowley is a 2019 novel based around the events of "Exercise Tiger" from the point of view of fictitious people and their individual stories.
- Sanford Margalith's novel Captains is a fictionalised account of his experiences during the Slapton Sands incident.
- In her book The Armada Boy, Kate Ellis relocated Exercise Tiger from Slapton to Bereton on the Devon coast, and used it as the background of the story.
- The Foyle's War episode "All Clear" included a plotline from the incident.
- The Jack Higgins novel Night of the Fox begins with a fictionalised account of the Battle of Lyme Bay and the primary plot involves rescuing one of the BIGOT officers.
- The Leslie Thomas novel The Magic Army is a fictionalised account of the evacuation of Slapton and the events leading up to the Slapton Sands disaster.
- The 1985 film Code Name: Emerald is based around the disaster. As part of a deception from a Nazi spy who is a British Double Agent a message is sent to German High Command indicating the location of a rehearsal for landings in France. Due to the secrecy around Operation Tiger they are unaware the location and time coincide with the Operation. Consequently, the E-boats attack and capture an officer with oversight of the D-Day landings. The plot revolves around ensuring his secrets are not revealed necessitating a delay in the Normandy plans.
- The J. D. Salinger short story "For Esmé—with Love and Squalor" is narrated by an American serviceman suffering Post Traumatic Stress Disorder after the Slapton Sands massacre and the Normandy invasion.
- The final issue of DC Comics Sgt. Rock concerns Exercise Tiger and its aftermath.
- The Amazing Story of Adolphus Tips by Michael Morpurgo is based around the events, following the story of a girl who is forced to leave Slapton and her cat.
- One of Ellie Dean's novels in the Cliffehaven Series called The Waiting Hours has a major plotline based on the events in Slapton Sands.
- Exercise Tiger is covered in two scenes in the 2026 film Pressure, which is about the meteorological preparations of D-Day and notes how the weather disrupted Exercise Tiger.

== Sources ==
- Ambrose, Stephen E. (1994). D-Day: June 6, 1944 – The Climactic Battle of WWII. London: Simon & Schuster. ISBN 978-0-67167-334-5.
- Butcher, Harry Cecil (1946). My Three Years with Eisenhower: The Personal Diary of Captain Harry C. Butcher, USNR, Naval Aide to General Eisenhower, 1942 to 1945. Simon & Schuster. pp. 528–535.
- Dear, Ian C. B.; Foot, Michael Richard Daniell (2001). The Oxford companion to World War II. New York: Oxford University Press. ISBN 978-0-19860-446-4.
- Happer, Richard (2019) [2014]. D-Day: The Story of the Allied Landings (2nd ed.). Glasgow: Times Books (HarperCollins). ISBN 978-0-00835-826-6.
- Herman, Jan K. (1997). Battle Station Sick Bay: Navy Medicine in World War II. Annapolis: Naval Institute Press. ISBN 978-1-55750-361-9.
- Lewis, Nigel (1990). Exercise Tiger: The Dramatic True Story of a Hidden Tragedy of World War II. New York: Prentice Hall. ISBN 978-0-13127-796-0.
- Margalith, Sanford H. (2001). Captains. Bedford, Indiana: JONA Books. ISBN 978-0-96579-298-1.
- Margaritis, Peter (2019). Countdown to D-Day: The German Perspective. Oxford & Pennsylvania: Casemate. ISBN 978-1-61200-769-4.
- Simpson, Michael A., ed. (2021) [1944]. Anglo-American-Canadian Naval Relations, 1943–1945. Contributor Navy Records Society. Routledge, Taylor & Francis Group. ISBN 978-1-032-00935-3.
- Small, Ken; Rogerson, Mark (1988). The Forgotten Dead – Why 946 American Servicemen Died Off The Coast Of Devon In 1944 – And The Man Who Discovered Their True Story. London: Bloomsbury. ISBN 978-0-74750-433-7.
