= Slapton Ley =

Lake on the south coast of Devon, England

Coordinates: 50.283°N 3.653°W

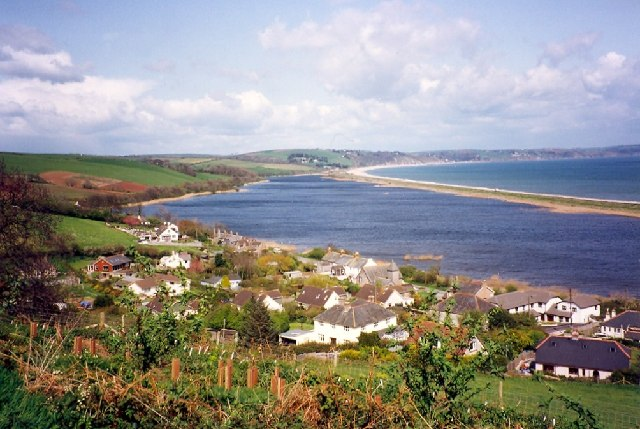
A view across Slapton Ley from Stokenham, near Torcross

Slapton Ley is a lake on the south coast of Devon, England, separated from Start Bay by a shingle beach, known as Slapton Sands.

Slapton Ley is the largest natural freshwater lake in south-west England being 1.5 miles (2.4 km) long and has two sections; the Lower Ley and the Higher Ley. The ley is fed by streams and a small river, The Gara, that flows into the Higher Ley. The site is a National Nature Reserve, a Site of Special Scientific Interest and a Geological Conservation Review site. The nature reserve covers over 200 hectares (490 acres).

The A379 between the Ley and the sea runs along the shingle ridge and was rebuilt after damage by coastal erosion in the early 2000s.

== Ecology and wildlife ==
The Slapton Ley nature reserve is owned by the Whitley Wildlife Conservation Trust and managed by the Field Studies Council. Slapton Ley’s beaches are affected by erosion but the beaches are formed from sediment; this makes them special because they are non-replaceable: once the sediment is moved it is gone. The beach can only become smaller. This threatens the security of the mainland because when the beaches are gone, mass amounts of water damage would occur on the land. The nature reserve would be destroyed and the site of special scientific interest would be lost.

There is a field centre near to the Ley also run by Field Studies Council

There is a large population of Cetti's warbler (Cettia cetti) at the site, and Eurasian bittern (Botaurus stellaris) are resident. The British endemic millipede, Anthogona britannica, known only from sites in South Devon, was first discovered at Slapton Ley.

Slapton Ley is the only UK site for strapwort (Corrigiola litoralis), a plant identified by Natural England as being at high risk of becoming extinct by 2020. Seed taken from the site, and grown at Paignton Zoo were successfully replanted at Loe Pool, Cornwall in May 2015; where it had previously been recorded since 1915.

Slapton Ley is remarkable for the very large number of fungi recorded there, with around 3000 species, including 21 new to science, observed there up to 1996 as a result of study over many years by multiple specialists. As a result, for fungi, it is one of the most intensively explored places on the planet. By comparison, the site contains only about 490 species of vascular plants, making the fungi about six times more speciose. This proportion, initially derived from Slapton Ley data, has been part of the evidence used to estimate the overall number of fungal species globally.
