= Hallsands =

Village in south Devon, England

Coordinates: 50°14′13″N 3°39′33″W

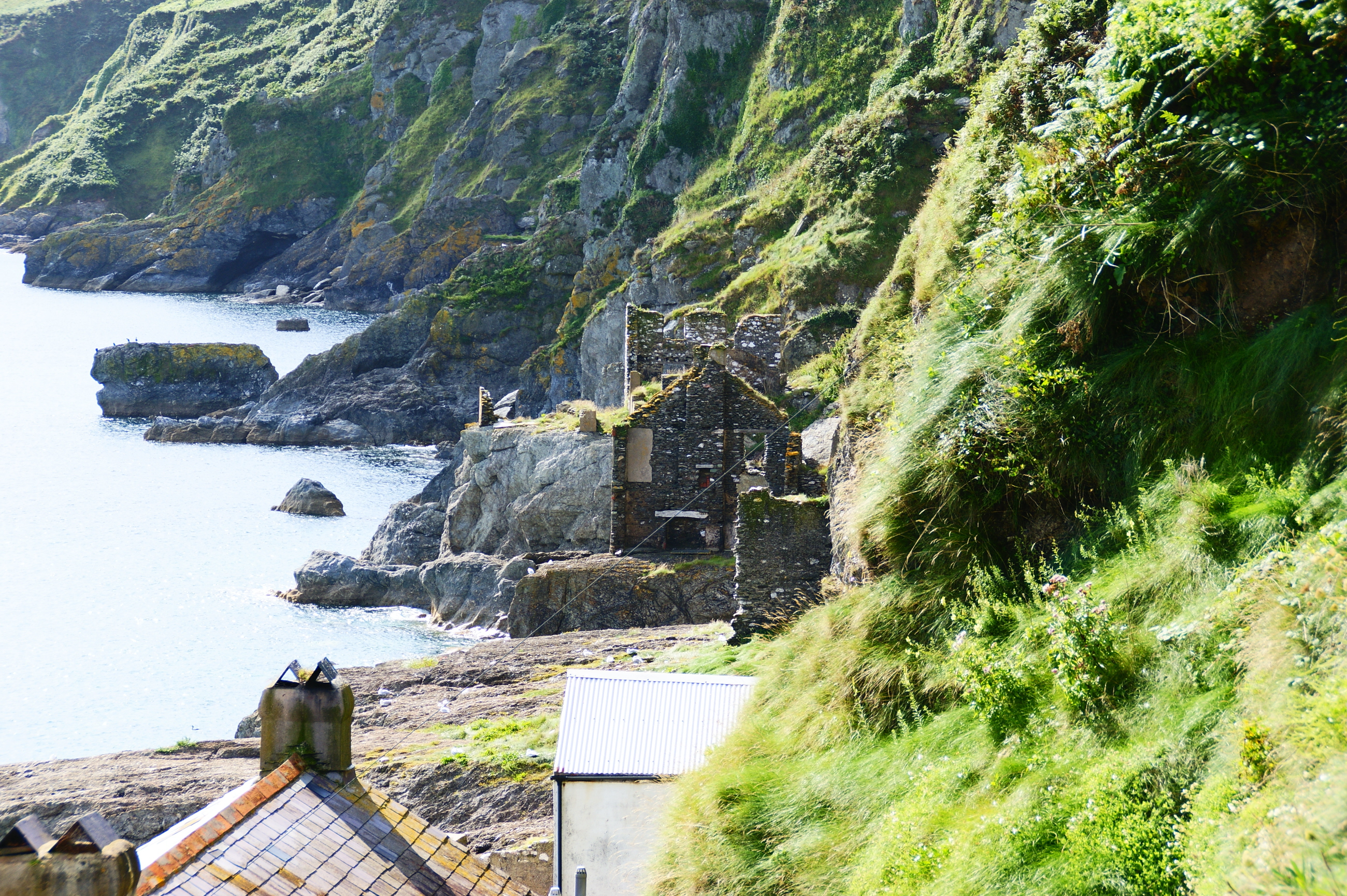
Hallsands in 2009

Hallsands is a village and beach in south Devon, England, in a precarious position between cliffs and the sea, between Beesands to the north and Start Point to the south.

== History ==
The early history of Hallsands is unknown, but a chapel has existed there since at least 1506. The village was at a cave known as Poke Hole, and probably was not inhabited before 1600. The village grew in size during the 18th and 19th centuries, and by 1891 it had 37 houses, a spring, a public house called the London Inn, and a population of 159. Most residents of Hallsands at that time depended on fishing for a living, particularly crab fishing on the nearby Skerries Bank.

The village grew along a rocky ledge in front of cliffs, with a sea wall, and sand and shingle banks adding some protection from the harsh weather and storms. Immense numbers of pilchards were being caught. The nearest school was 2 miles (3.2 km) from the village.

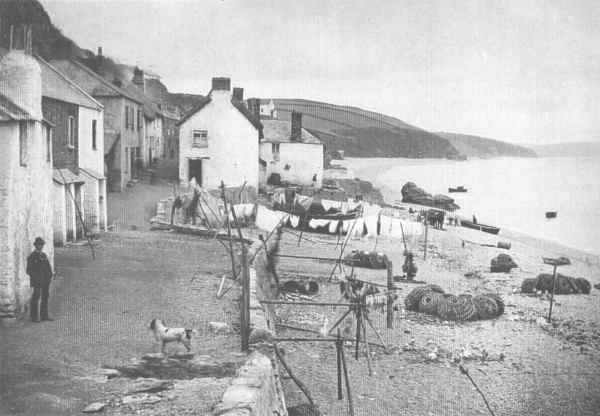
Hallsands in 1885.

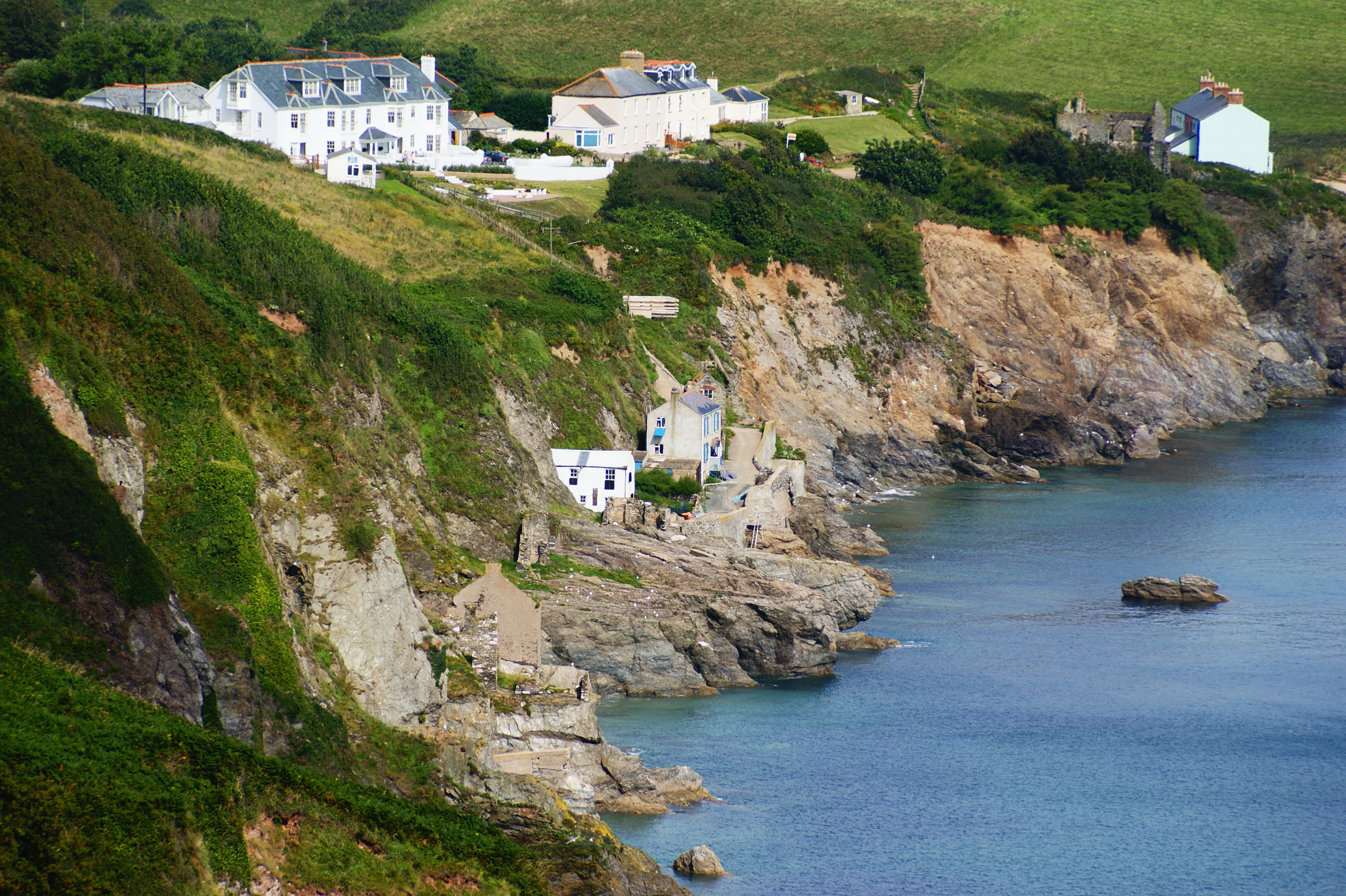
Destroyed houses at Hallsands (beneath the cliffs) and Trout's Hotel and the Coastguard Cottages (on the cliff)

=== Impact of dredging ===
In the 1890s, following a scheme proposed by Sir John Jackson, it was decided to expand the naval dockyard at Keyham, near Plymouth, and dredging began offshore from Hallsands to provide sand and gravel for its construction. Soon, up to 1,600 tons of material was being removed each day, and the level of the beach began to drop, much to the alarm of local residents. The protests also included concerns that crab pots would be damaged and disturbance to the fish stocks. The Board of Trade agreed to establish a local inquiry in response to protests from villagers, who feared that the dredging might destabilise the beach and thereby threaten the village. The inquiry found that the activity was not likely to pose a significant threat to the village, so dredging continued. A payment of £125 per year to the fishers were given as compensation for the interference with fishing.

By 1900, however, the level of the beach had started to fall; estimated between 7 and 12 feet (2.1 and 3.7 m). In 1900's autumn storms, part of the sea wall was washed away. In November 1900, villagers petitioned their Member of Parliament complaining of damage to their houses, and in March 1901 Kingsbridge Rural District Council wrote to the Board of Trade complaining of damage to the road. In September 1901 a new Board of Trade inspector concluded that further severe storms could cause serious damage and recommended that dredging be stopped. On 8 January 1902 the dredging licence was revoked. During 1902 the level of the beach recovered, but 1902 winter brought more storms and damage.

The 1903 storms saw further damage to the London Inn, and other buildings. A newer and stronger sea wall was constructed in 1906, to protect the remaining 25 cottages which housed 93 inhabitants.

=== January 1917 storm ===
On Friday 26 January 1917 the fishermen, noting the weather and tide, hauled the boats high onto the village's street and battened them down, and children were moved to a nearby cottage. A combination of easterly gales and exceptionally high tides breached Hallsands' defences. Eyewitnesses indicated "the seas came tumbling in, shaking everything all to pieces. We became greatly alarmed", the gales increased, with walls coming down, and waves going over the house rafters. It was reported the 'sea came down the chimney'. By midnight, four houses were gone and none were intact; and in the morning, the beach strewn with house timbers and furniture. The next high tide of Monday 28 January 1917 broke the sea walls and the village was effectively destroyed.

By the end of that year only one house remained habitable, the highest-located house of the Prettejohn family. The resulting inquiry found dredging was at fault, but refused to release the report to the public at the time. The villagers' fight for compensation took seven years; the £6,000 also felt to be inadequate. A decision was made not to reconstruct the village where it stood.

According to Pathe News newsreel footage from 1960, the last inhabitant of the village was Mrs Elizabeth Prettejohn (1884–1964).

The village has been a case study for coastal erosion by dredging.

== Present day ==
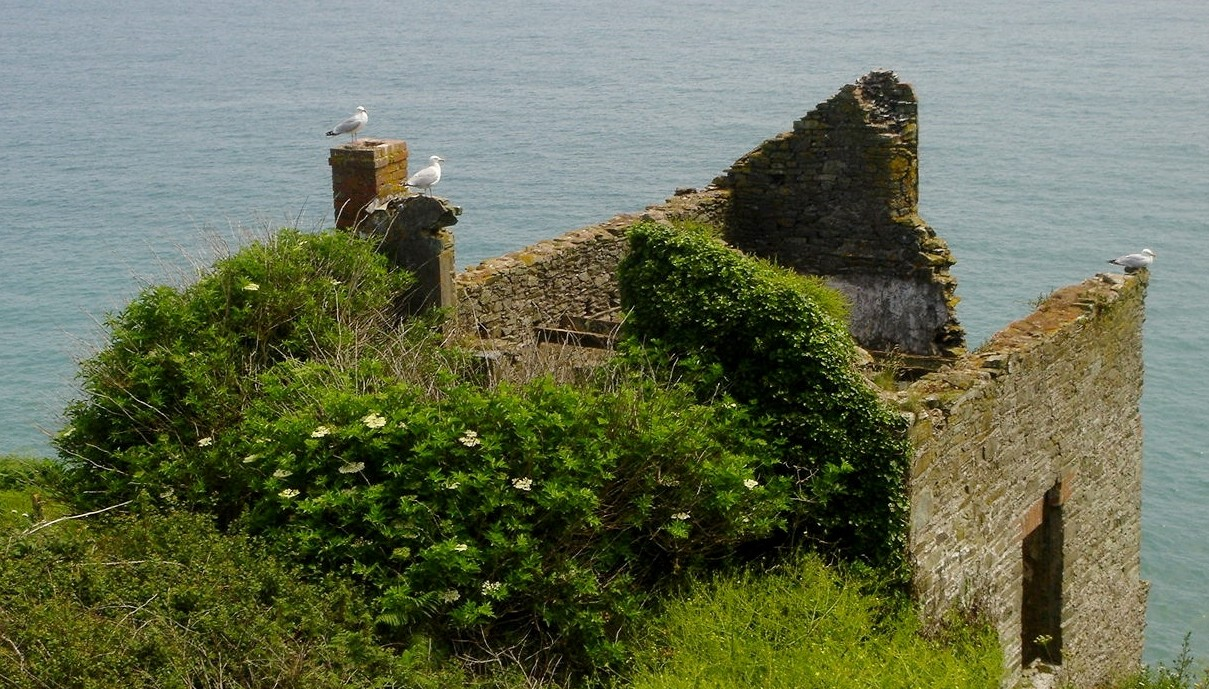
Ruins of the Old Chapel at Hallsands

The site of the old village at South Hallsands is closed off to the public, although South Hams District Council has built a viewing platform, which is accessed from the track below Prospect House Apartments (formerly Trout's Hotel). Two houses remained intact and were used as holiday homes.

In May 2012, the access road, viewing platform and the two houses were affected by a 200 tonne landslide, leading to the houses being evacuated and the affected area cordoned off which now prevents access to the platform.

The beach at North Hallsands (also known as "Greenstraight") is the only one at Hallsands. The beach below the old village no longer exists, having been removed by the previous dredging and repeated storms. In 2016 the beach at North Hallsands was reported to have been washed away by storms, leaving only a peat underlay which contains the remnants of a petrified forest. However, this is part of a regular natural cycle which occurs every few years, as are the more frequent episodes where the shingle from North Hallsands is removed by the scouring action of the local sea currents, deposited at other parts of the bay and then eventually returned by the same process.

There are no plans to restore the sea defences at North Hallsands or protect the few houses at possible risk as South Hams Council has had a policy of no intervention since 2002.

== In literature, music, film and online art projects ==
In 1903, English writer John Masefield published "Ballads", a collection of poems including "Hall Sands". The introductory part of the poem alerted that "the land in which the village stands is beginning to slip and settle".

The 1964 film The System directed by Michael Winner, starring Oliver Reed and Jane Merrow filmed scenes with the two actors at the ruins.

In 1993, the poet William Oxley published 'The Hallsands Tragedy', a series of poems about Hallsands and its fate.

In 2002, dramatist Julian Garner wrote the play Silent Engine set in the ruins of Hallsands about a couple whose marriage is as wrecked as the village following the death of their young child. It was presented on a short tour and at the Edinburgh Festival by Pentabus Theatre Company performed by Cathy Owen and Robin Pirongs. A second production was staged at Cheltenham Playhouse by Ad Hoc Theatre Co in May 2010 performed by Rachel Prudden and Paul Scott.

In 2003 BBC Radio 4 first broadcast the play, Death Of A Village, by writer David Gooderson. The play addresses the events of 1917, emphasizing that the underlying cause was not that year's combination of severe storms in itself but the dredging of the beach for gravel by government contractors, which had been taking place for several decades despite many warnings of its dangers. The play was based on contemporary records and looks at the events leading up to the great storm, and the village's subsequent fight for compensation.

In 2006, the opera company 'Streetwise Opera' commissioned a new opera, Whirlwind, based on the story of Hallsands. It was written by Will Todd and Ben Dunwell and premièred at The Sage Gateshead, on 24 October 2006.

On 15 November 2010, Damon Albarn revealed on BBC Radio 4's Today Programme that Hallsands is the beach which inspired him and Jamie Hewlett to produce the Gorillaz Plastic Beach LP.

In the 2016 Julien Temple-directed documentary on Keith Richards, Keith Richards - The Origin of the Species, Richards told how he used to holiday as a child with his family at Hallsands.

In 2017, British prog-rock band 'Kaprekar's Constant' released a 14-minute epic in their album 'Fate outsmarts desire' about the Hallsands story. In the same year, artist Frances Gynn, musicians Lona Kozik, and Sam Richards collaborated on a web-project titled Hallsands arts.

In 2019, Devon folk duo 'Harbottle & Jonas' released their latest album 'The Sea is My Brother', which has the track 'Hall Sands', which is about the events in 1917.

== See also ==
- Coastal erosion
- Ella Trout
