= List of United Kingdom locations: Al =

The United Kingdom

This is part of the list of United Kingdom locations: a gazetteer of place names in the United Kingdom showing each place's locality and geographical coordinates.

== Al ==
=== Ala-Alk ===
Location	Locality	Coordinates (links to map & photo sources)	OS grid reference
Albany	Sunderland	54.90°N 01.54°W	NZ2957
Albany Park	Bexley	51.426°N 00.103°E	TQ478728
Alberbury	Shropshire	52.72°N 02.94°W	SJ3614
Albert Town	Pembrokeshire	51.79°N 04.98°W	SM9415
Albert Village	Leicestershire	52.75°N 01.55°W	SK3018
Albourne	West Sussex	50.92°N 00.20°W	TQ2616
Albourne Green	West Sussex	50.92°N 00.20°W	TQ2616
Albrighton (Bridgnorth)	Shropshire	52.63°N 02.28°W	SJ8104
Albrighton (Shrewsbury)	Shropshire	52.75°N 02.75°W	SJ4918
Albro Castle	Pembrokeshire	52.08°N 04.68°W	SN1646
Alburgh	Norfolk	52.42°N 01.33°E	TM2786
Albury	Surrey	51.21°N 00.49°W	TQ0547
Albury	Hertfordshire	51.89°N 00.07°E	TL4324
Albury End	Hertfordshire	51.88°N 00.06°E	TL4223
Albury Heath	Surrey	51.20°N 00.48°W	TQ0646
Albyfield	Cumbria	54.86°N 02.71°W	NY5452
Alby Hill	Norfolk	52.85°N 01.25°E	TG1934
Alcaig	Highland	57.58°N 04.41°W	NH5657
Alcaston	Shropshire	52.47°N 02.81°W	SO4587
Alcester	Dorset	50.99°N 02.21°W	ST8522
Alcester	Warwickshire	52.21°N 01.88°W	SP0857
Alcester Lane's End	Birmingham	52.41°N 01.89°W	SP0780
Alciston	East Sussex	50.82°N 00.12°E	TQ5005
Alcombe	Somerset	51.19°N 03.47°W	SS9745
Alcombe	Wiltshire	51.41°N 02.28°W	ST8069
Alconbury	Cambridgeshire	52.36°N 00.26°W	TL1875
Alconbury Weston	Cambridgeshire	52.36°N 00.28°W	TL1776
Aldborough	North Yorkshire	54.08°N 01.38°W	SE4066
Aldborough	Norfolk	52.85°N 01.23°E	TG1834
Aldborough Hatch	Redbridge	51.58°N 00.09°E	TQ4589
Aldbourne	Wiltshire	51.47°N 01.62°W	SU2675
Aldbrough	East Riding of Yorkshire	53.82°N 00.11°W	TA2438
Aldbrough St John	North Yorkshire	54.49°N 01.69°W	NZ2011
Aldbury	Hertfordshire	51.79°N 00.60°W	SP9612
Aldcliffe	Lancashire	54.03°N 02.82°W	SD4660
Aldclune	Perth and Kinross	56.74°N 03.81°W	NN8963
Aldeburgh	Suffolk	52.14°N 01.59°E	TM4656
Aldeby	Norfolk	52.48°N 01.60°E	TM4593
Aldenham	Hertfordshire	51.66°N 00.36°W	TQ1398
Alderbrook	East Sussex	51.04°N 00.16°E	TQ5229
Alderbury	Wiltshire	51.03°N 01.74°W	SU1826
Aldercar	Derbyshire	53.01°N 01.34°W	SK4447
Alderford	Norfolk	52.71°N 01.13°E	TG1218
Alder Forest	Salford	53.48°N 02.37°W	SJ7599
Alderholt	Dorset	50.90°N 01.83°W	SU1212
Alderley	Gloucestershire	51.60°N 02.34°W	ST7690
Alderley Edge	Cheshire East	53.29°N 02.24°W	SJ8478
Alderman's Green	Coventry	52.44°N 01.48°W	SP3583
Aldermaston	Berkshire	51.38°N 01.15°W	SU5965
Aldermaston Soke	Berkshire	51.36°N 01.12°W	SU6163
Aldermaston Wharf	Berkshire	51.39°N 01.13°W	SU6067
Alderminster	Warwickshire	52.13°N 01.66°W	SP2348
Aldermoor	City of Southampton	50.93°N 01.44°W	SU3915
Alder Moor	Staffordshire	52.84°N 01.67°W	SK2227
Alderney	Poole	50.74°N 01.94°W	SZ0494
Alder Row	Somerset	51.18°N 02.33°W	ST7743
Aldersbrook	Redbridge	51.56°N 00.01°E	TQ4087
Alder's End	Herefordshire	52.04°N 02.55°W	SO6239
Aldersey Green	Cheshire West and Chester	53.09°N 02.80°W	SJ4656
Aldershawe	Staffordshire	52.66°N 01.85°W	SK1007
Aldershot	Hampshire	51.24°N 00.76°W	SU8650
Aldersley	Wolverhampton	52.607°N 02.154°W	SJ8901
Alderton	Suffolk	52.01°N 01.40°E	TM3441
Alderton	Northamptonshire	52.10°N 00.92°W	SP7446
Alderton	Gloucestershire	51.99°N 02.00°W	SP0033
Alderton	Wiltshire	51.53°N 02.24°W	ST8382
Alderton	Shropshire	52.80°N 02.75°W	SJ4923
Alderton Fields	Gloucestershire	51.98°N 02.00°W	SP0032
Alderwasley	Derbyshire	53.07°N 01.53°W	SK3153
Aldfield	North Yorkshire	54.11°N 01.60°W	SE2669
Aldford	Cheshire West and Chester	53.12°N 02.88°W	SJ4159
Aldgate	Rutland	52.62°N 00.55°W	SK9804
Aldham	Suffolk	52.06°N 00.97°E	TM0445
Aldham	Essex	51.89°N 00.78°E	TL9226
Aldingbourne	West Sussex	50.83°N 00.69°W	SU9205
Aldingham	Cumbria	54.13°N 03.10°W	SD2871
Aldington	Kent	51.08°N 00.94°E	TR0636
Aldington	Worcestershire	52.09°N 01.91°W	SP0644
Aldington Frith	Kent	51.08°N 00.91°E	TR0436
Aldon	Shropshire	52.40°N 02.83°W	SO4379
Aldoth	Cumbria	54.81°N 03.34°W	NY1448
Aldreth	Cambridgeshire	52.33°N 00.11°E	TL4473
Aldridge	Walsall	52.59°N 01.92°W	SK0500
Aldringham	Suffolk	52.18°N 01.56°E	TM4460
Aldrington	Brighton and Hove	50.83°N 00.19°W	TQ2705
Aldsworth	Gloucestershire	51.78°N 01.78°W	SP1510
Aldwark	North Yorkshire	54.06°N 01.29°W	SE4663
Aldwark	Derbyshire	53.11°N 01.67°W	SK2257
Aldwarke	Rotherham	53.44°N 01.33°W	SK4494
Aldwick	West Sussex	50.77°N 00.71°W	SZ9198
Aldwincle	Northamptonshire	52.41°N 00.53°W	TL0081
Aldworth	Berkshire	51.50°N 01.20°W	SU5579
Ale Oak	Shropshire	52.44°N 03.14°W	SO2284
Alexandria	West Dunbartonshire	55.98°N 04.58°W	NS3980
Aley	Somerset	51.12°N 03.17°W	ST1837
Aley Green	Bedfordshire	51.85°N 00.46°W	TL0618
Alfardisworthy	Devon	50.87°N 04.43°W	SS2911
Alfington	Devon	50.77°N 03.26°W	SY1198
Alfold	Surrey	51.09°N 00.53°W	TQ0334
Alfold Bars	West Sussex	51.08°N 00.53°W	TQ0333
Alfold Crossways	Surrey	51.10°N 00.51°W	TQ0435
Alford	Somerset	51.08°N 02.57°W	ST6032
Alford	Lincolnshire	53.25°N 00.17°E	TF4575
Alford	Aberdeenshire	57.23°N 02.71°W	NJ5716
Alfred's Well	Worcestershire	52.34°N 02.08°W	SO9472
Alfreton	Derbyshire	53.09°N 01.38°W	SK4155
Alfrick	Worcestershire	52.17°N 02.38°W	SO7453
Alfrick Pound	Worcestershire	52.16°N 02.38°W	SO7452
Alfriston	East Sussex	50.80°N 00.14°E	TQ5103
Algarkirk	Lincolnshire	52.89°N 00.08°W	TF2935
Alhampton	Somerset	51.10°N 02.54°W	ST6234
Alisary	Highland	56.84°N 05.70°W	NM7479
Alkborough	North Lincolnshire	53.67°N 00.66°W	SE8821
Alkerton	Oxfordshire	52.07°N 01.46°W	SP3742
Alkerton	Gloucestershire	51.74°N 02.33°W	SO7705
Alkham	Kent	51.13°N 01.21°E	TR2542
Alkington	Shropshire	52.93°N 02.71°W	SJ5238
Alkmonton	Derbyshire	52.93°N 01.73°W	SK1838
Alkrington Garden Village	Rochdale	53.53°N 02.19°W	SD8704

=== All ===
Location	Locality	Coordinates (links to map & photo sources)	OS grid reference
Allaleigh	Devon	50.36°N 03.68°W	SX8053
Allanaquoich	Aberdeenshire	57.00°N 03.45°W	NO1291
Allanbank	Scottish Borders	55.71°N 02.76°W	NT5247
Allanbank	North Lanarkshire	55.79°N 03.85°W	NS8457
Allanshaugh	Scottish Borders	55.73°N 02.90°W	NT4349
Allanshaws	Scottish Borders	55.67°N 02.81°W	NT4943
Allanton	South Lanarkshire	55.76°N 04.00°W	NS7454
Allanton	North Lanarkshire	55.79°N 03.83°W	NS8557
Allanton	Scottish Borders	55.77°N 02.22°W	NT8654
Allasdale	Western Isles	56.99°N 07.50°W	NF6603
Allaston	Gloucestershire	51.73°N 02.53°W	SO6304
Allbrook	Hampshire	50.98°N 01.36°W	SU4521
All Cannings	Wiltshire	51.34°N 01.90°W	SU0761
Allendale Town	Northumberland	54.88°N 02.26°W	NY8355
Allen End	Warwickshire	52.56°N 01.76°W	SP1696
Allenheads	Northumberland	54.80°N 02.23°W	NY8545
Allensford	County Durham	54.84°N 01.89°W	NZ0750
Allen's Green	Hertfordshire	51.82°N 00.10°E	TL4516
Allensmore	Herefordshire	52.01°N 02.78°W	SO4635
Allenton	City of Derby	52.88°N 01.46°W	SK3632
Allenwood	Cumbria	54.88°N 02.79°W	NY4955
Aller (Kentisbeare)	Devon	50.84°N 03.35°W	ST0506
Aller (Newton Abbot)	Devon	50.50°N 03.59°W	SX8768
Aller	Dorset	50.81°N 02.34°W	ST7602
Aller	Somerset	51.05°N 02.85°W	ST4029
Allerby	Cumbria	54.73°N 03.43°W	NY0839
Allercombe	Devon	50.73°N 03.36°W	SY0494
Allerford (Selworthy)	Somerset	51.21°N 03.57°W	SS9047
Allerford (Oake)	Somerset	51.01°N 03.18°W	ST1725
Aller Grove	Devon	50.75°N 03.34°W	SY0596
Aller Park	Devon	50.50°N 03.59°W	SX8769
Allerston	North Yorkshire	54.22°N 00.66°W	SE8782
Allerthorpe	East Riding of Yorkshire	53.91°N 00.81°W	SE7847
Allerton	Bradford	53.80°N 01.83°W	SE1134
Allerton	Liverpool	53.36°N 02.88°W	SJ4186
Allerton Bywater	Leeds	53.73°N 01.36°W	SE4227
Allerton Mauleverer	North Yorkshire	54.01°N 01.37°W	SE4158
Allesley	Coventry	52.42°N 01.57°W	SP2981
Allestree	City of Derby	52.94°N 01.49°W	SK3439
Allet	Cornwall	50.29°N 05.10°W	SW7948
Allexton	Leicestershire	52.59°N 00.80°W	SK8100
Allgreave	Cheshire	53.19°N 02.04°W	SJ9766
Allhallows	Kent	51.46°N 00.63°E	TQ8377
Allhallows-on-Sea	Kent	51.47°N 00.63°E	TQ8378
Alligin Shuas	Highland	57.56°N 05.62°W	NG8358
Allimore Green	Staffordshire	52.76°N 02.22°W	SJ8519
Allington	Dorset	50.73°N 02.76°W	SY4693
Allington	Kent	51.28°N 00.49°E	TQ7457
Allington	Lincolnshire	52.95°N 00.73°W	SK8540
Allington (near Chippenham)	Wiltshire	51.47°N 02.15°W	ST8975
Allington (near Devizes)	Wiltshire	51.36°N 01.91°W	SU0663
Allington (near Salisbury)	Wiltshire	51.15°N 01.71°W	SU2039
Allington Bar	Wiltshire	51.46°N 02.15°W	ST8974
Allithwaite	Cumbria	54.17°N 02.95°W	SD3876
Alloa	Clackmannan	56.10°N 03.80°W	NS8892
Allonby	Cumbria	54.77°N 03.43°W	NY0843
Allostock	Cheshire	53.23°N 02.39°W	SJ7471
Alloway	South Ayrshire	55.42°N 04.64°W	NS3318
Allowenshay	Somerset	50.91°N 02.86°W	ST3913
All Saints	Devon	50.80°N 02.99°W	ST3001
All Saints' South Elmham	Suffolk	52.38°N 01.43°E	TM3482
Allscott (Worfield)	Shropshire	52.56°N 02.39°W	SO7396
Allscott (Wrockwardine)	Telford and Wrekin	52.71°N 02.57°W	SJ6113
All Stretton	Shropshire	52.55°N 02.79°W	SO4695
Allt	Carmarthenshire	51.69°N 04.09°W	SN5502
Alltami	Flintshire	53.17°N 03.10°W	SJ2665
Alltmawr	Powys	52.10°N 03.35°W	SO0746
Alltour	Highland	56.88°N 04.92°W	NN2281
Alltsigh	Highland	57.23°N 04.56°W	NH4519
Alltwalis	Carmarthenshire	51.95°N 04.27°W	SN4431
Alltwen	Neath Port Talbot	51.71°N 03.85°W	SN7203
Alltyblaca	Ceredigion	52.08°N 04.16°W	SN5245
Allt-yr-yn	City of Newport	51.58°N 03.02°W	ST2988
Allwood Green	Suffolk	52.30°N 00.99°E	TM0472

=== Alm-Alz ===
Location	Locality	Coordinates (links to map & photo sources)	OS grid reference
Alma	Nottinghamshire	53.06°N 01.30°W	SK4752
Almagill	Dumfries and Galloway	55.06°N 03.42°W	NY0975
Almeley	Herefordshire	52.15°N 02.98°W	SO3351
Almeley Wootton	Herefordshire	52.16°N 02.98°W	SO3352
Almer	Dorset	50.78°N 02.12°W	SY9198
Almholme	Doncaster	53.56°N 01.12°W	SE5808
Almington	Staffordshire	52.90°N 02.44°W	SJ7034
Alminstone Cross	Devon	50.95°N 04.36°W	SS3420
Almondbank	Perth and Kinross	56.41°N 03.52°W	NO0626
Almondbury	Kirklees	53.63°N 01.75°W	SE1615
Almondsbury	South Gloucestershire	51.55°N 02.57°W	ST6084
Almondvale	West Lothian	55.87°N 03.52°W	NT0566
Almshouse Green	Essex	51.96°N 00.54°E	TL7533
Alne	North Yorkshire	54.07°N 01.25°W	SE4965
Alne End	Warwickshire	52.22°N 01.84°W	SP1159
Alne Hills	Warwickshire	52.23°N 01.84°W	SP1160
Alness	Highland	57.69°N 04.26°W	NH6569
Alnessferry	Highland	57.65°N 04.24°W	NH6665
Alne Station	North Yorkshire	54.08°N 01.23°W	SE5066
Alnham	Northumberland	55.38°N 02.01°W	NT9910
Alnmouth	Northumberland	55.38°N 01.62°W	NU2410
Alnwick	Northumberland	55.41°N 01.71°W	NU1813
Alperton	Brent	51.53°N 00.29°W	TQ1883
Alphamstone	Essex	51.98°N 00.72°E	TL8735
Alpheton	Suffolk	52.11°N 00.74°E	TL8850
Alphington	Devon	50.69°N 03.54°W	SX9189
Alpington	Norfolk	52.55°N 01.37°E	TG2901
Alport	Derbyshire	53.17°N 01.67°W	SK2264
Alport	Powys	52.54°N 03.07°W	SO2795
Alpraham	Cheshire	53.12°N 02.62°W	SJ5859
Alresford	Essex	51.84°N 00.98°E	TM0621
Alrewas	Staffordshire	52.72°N 01.76°W	SK1614
Alsager	Cheshire	53.09°N 02.31°W	SJ7955
Alsagers Bank	Staffordshire	53.02°N 02.29°W	SJ8048
Alscot	Buckinghamshire	51.72°N 00.84°W	SP8004
Alsop en le Dale	Derbyshire	53.09°N 01.76°W	SK1655
Alston	Devon	50.81°N 02.99°W	ST3002
Alston	Cumbria	54.80°N 02.45°W	NY7146
Alstone	Somerset	51.20°N 02.98°W	ST3146
Alstone (Cheltenham)	Gloucestershire	51.89°N 02.10°W	SO9322
Alstone (Tewkesbury)	Gloucestershire	51.98°N 02.03°W	SO9832
Alstonefield	Staffordshire	53.09°N 01.80°W	SK1355
Alston Sutton	Somerset	51.25°N 02.84°W	ST4151
Alswear	Devon	50.98°N 03.82°W	SS7222
Alt	Oldham	53.52°N 02.09°W	SD9403
Altarnun	Cornwall	50.60°N 04.51°W	SX2281
Altass	Highland	57.96°N 04.55°W	NC4900
Altbough	Herefordshire	51.96°N 02.67°W	SO5430
Altens	City of Aberdeen	57.10°N 02.08°W	NJ9502
Altham	Lancashire	53.78°N 02.35°W	SD7732
Alt Hill	Tameside	53.51°N 02.09°W	SD9402
Althorne	Essex	51.64°N 00.75°E	TQ9198
Althorpe	North Lincolnshire	53.57°N 00.74°W	SE8309
Altmore	Berkshire	51.50°N 00.77°W	SU8579
Altnaharra	Highland	58.28°N 04.45°W	NC5635
Altofts	Wakefield	53.70°N 01.44°W	SE3723
Alton	Derbyshire	53.17°N 01.46°W	SK3664
Alton	Hampshire	51.14°N 00.98°W	SU7139
Alton	Staffordshire	52.97°N 01.89°W	SK0742
Alton	Wiltshire	51.21°N 01.78°W	SU1546
Alton Barnes	Wiltshire	51.35°N 01.85°W	SU1062
Altonhill	East Ayrshire	55.61°N 04.51°W	NS4239
Alton Pancras	Dorset	50.81°N 02.44°W	ST6902
Alton Priors	Wiltshire	51.35°N 01.84°W	SU1162
Altrincham	Trafford	53.37°N 02.36°W	SJ7687
Altskeith	Stirling	56.18°N 04.48°W	NN4602
Alum Rock	Birmingham	52.48°N 01.83°W	SP1187
Alva	Clackmannan	56.14°N 03.80°W	NS8896
Alvanley	Cheshire	53.25°N 02.76°W	SJ4973
Alvaston	City of Derby	52.89°N 01.43°W	SK3833
Alvechurch	Worcestershire	52.34°N 01.97°W	SP0272
Alvecote	Warwickshire	52.63°N 01.64°W	SK2404
Alvediston	Wiltshire	51.00°N 02.04°W	ST9723
Alveley	Shropshire	52.45°N 02.35°W	SO7684
Alverdiscott	Devon	51.00°N 04.12°W	SS5125
Alverstoke	Hampshire	50.77°N 01.16°W	SZ5998
Alverstone	Isle of Wight	50.66°N 01.19°W	SZ5785
Alverthorpe	Wakefield	53.68°N 01.53°W	SE3121
Alverton	Nottinghamshire	52.96°N 00.82°W	SK7942
Alves	Moray	57.64°N 03.45°W	NJ1362
Alvescot	Oxfordshire	51.73°N 01.61°W	SP2704
Alveston	Warwickshire	52.20°N 01.66°W	SP2356
Alveston	South Gloucestershire	51.58°N 02.53°W	ST6388
Alveston Down	South Gloucestershire	51.58°N 02.54°W	ST6288
Alveston Hill	Warwickshire	52.18°N 01.67°W	SP2254
Alvie	Highland	57.15°N 03.88°W	NH8609
Alvingham	Lincolnshire	53.39°N 00.04°E	TF3691
Alvington	Gloucestershire	51.69°N 02.58°W	SO6000
Alvington	Somerset	50.93°N 02.68°W	ST5215
Alwalton	Cambridgeshire	52.54°N 00.33°W	TL1395
Alway	City of Newport	51.58°N 02.95°W	ST3488
Alweston	Dorset	50.92°N 02.48°W	ST6614
Alwington	Devon	50.98°N 04.28°W	SS4023
Alwinton	Northumberland	55.34°N 02.12°W	NT9206
Alwoodley	Leeds	53.85°N 01.54°W	SE3040
Alwoodley Gates	Leeds	53.85°N 01.53°W	SE3140
Alwoodley Park	Leeds	53.85°N 01.56°W	SE2940
Alyth	Perth and Kinross	56.61°N 03.24°W	NO2448
