= List of places in Devon =

Some of the larger settlements of Devon.

The following settlements and places of interest are located in Devon, England.

== A ==
Abbey, Abbots Bickington

Abbotsham Abbotskerswell Abbotsleigh Aish Alfington

- Alfardisworthy
- Aller
- Allercombe
- Aller Grove
- Aller Park
- All Saints
- Alminstone Cross
- Alphington
- Alston
- Alswear
- Alverdiscott
- Alwington
- Appledore (Mid Devon)
- Appledore (North Devon)
- Arlington
- Arlington Beccott
- Ashburton
- Ashbury
- Ashcombe
- Ashculme
- Ashford (North Devon)
- Ashford (South Hams)
- Ashill
- Ashmansworthy
- Ash Mill
- Ashprington
- Ashreigney
- Ash Thomas
- Ashton
- Ashwater
- Atherington
- Aunk
- Aveton Gifford
- Awliscombe
- Axminster
- Axmouth
- Aylesbeare

== B ==
- Babbacombe
- Babeny
- Badworthy
- Ballhill
- Bampton
- Bantham Cross
- Barnstaple
- Beaford
- Beaworthy
- Beer
- Beesands
- Beeson
- Belstone
- Bere Alston
- Bere Ferrers
- Berry Head
- Berrynarbor
- Berry Pomeroy
- Bickington
- Bickleigh
- Bicton
- Bideford
- Bigbury
- Bishop's Nympton
- Bishop's Tawton
- Bishopsteignton
- Bittadon
- Bittaford
- Blackawton
- Blackborough
- Black Dog
- Black Torrington
- Bodley
- Bodmiscombe
- Bolberry
- Bondleigh
- Boode
- Bovey Tracey
- Bow
- Bradford
- Bradninch
- Bradstone
- Bradworthy
- Brampford Speke
- Branscombe
- Bratton Clovelly
- Bratton Fleming
- Braunton
- Brealeys
- Breazle
- Brendon
- Brentor
- Bridestowe
- Bridford
- Bridgerule
- Brithem Bottom
- Brixham
- Brixton
- Broadclyst
- Broadhembury
- Broadhempston
- Broadwoodkelly
- Broadwoodwidger
- Brushford
- Brynsworthy
- Buckerell
- Buckfast
- Buckfastleigh
- Buckland Brewer
- Buckland Filleigh
- Buckland in the Moor
- Buckland Monachorum
- Buckland-Tout-Saints
- Budleigh Salterton
- Bulkworthy
- Burgh Island
- Burlescombe
- Burrington
- Butterleigh

== C ==
- Cadbury
- Cadeleigh
- Calverleigh
- Carley
- Carlingwark
- Chagford
- Challacombe
- Chapelton
- Chardstock
- Charles
- Charleton
- Chawleigh
- Chelfham
- Cheriton Bishop
- Cheriton Fitzpaine
- Cheston
- Chillington
- Chittlehamholt
- Chittlehampton
- Chivelstone
- Christow
- Chudleigh
- Chudleigh Knighton
- Chulmleigh
- Churchstow
- Churston Ferrers
- Clawton
- Clayhanger
- Clayhidon
- Clovelly
- Clyst Honiton
- Clyst Hydon
- Clyst St George
- Clyst St Lawrence
- Clyst St Mary
- Cockington
- Coffinswell
- Colaton Raleigh
- Coldharbour
- Coldridge
- Colebrooke
- Colyford
- Colyton
- Combeinteignhead
- Combe Martin
- Combe Raleigh
- Combpyne
- Cookbury
- Copplestone
- Cornwood
- Cornworthy
- Coryton
- Cotleigh
- Cowleymoor
- Countisbury
- Craddock
- Crapstone
- Crazelowman
- Crediton
- Crocker's Hele
- Crockernwell
- Crook
- Crooke
- Crowden
- Croyde
- Cruwys Ball
- Cruwys Morchard
- Cullompton
- Culm Davy
- Culmstock
- Culverlane

== D ==
- Dalwood
- Dartington
- Dartmouth
- Dawlish
- Dean Prior
- Derriford
- Derril
- Devonport
- Diptford
- Dinworthy
- Dittisham
- Doddiscombsleigh
- Dolton
- Dowland
- Downes
- Down St Mary
- Down Thomas
- Downicary
- Drewsteignton
- Dubbs Cross
- Duerdon
- Dunchideock
- Dunkeswell
- Dunsford
- Dunstone
- Dunterton

== E ==
- East Allington
- East Anstey
- East Buckland
- East Budleigh
- East Charleton
- East Cornworthy
- East Down
- East Knowstone
- East Portlemouth
- East Putford
- East Worlington
- Eggesford
- Enis
- Ermington
- Estover
- Eworthy
- Exbourne
- Exeter
- Exminster
- Exmouth

== F ==
- Fairmile
- Farringdon
- Farway
- Feniton
- Filleigh
- Folly Gate
- Ford, Chivelstone
- Ford, East Devon
- Ford, Holbeton
- Ford, Plymouth
- Ford, Torridge
- Forder Green
- Fremington
- Frithelstock

== G ==
- Galmpton (South Hams)
- Galmpton (Torbay)
- Gappah
- Georgeham
- George Nympton
- Germansweek
- Gidleigh
- Gittisham
- Glendon
- Glenholt
- Golland
- Goodleigh
- Goosemoor
- Goosewell
- Great Torrington
- Grenofen

== H ==
- Haccombe
- Halberton
- Haldon
- Hallsands
- Halwell
- Halwill
- Hand and Pen
- Harberton
- Harbertonford
- Harford
- Harpford
- Hartland
- Hatherleigh
- Hawkchurch
- Haytor Vale
- Heanton Punchardon
- Heathfield
- Heavitree
- Hele (Mid Devon)
- Hele (Teignbridge)
- Hele (Torquay)
- Hele (Torridge)
- Hele Bay
- Hemyock
- Hennock
- Hemerdon Bal
- Highampton
- High Bray
- High Bickington
- Hillmoor
- Hittisleigh
- Holbeton
- Holcombe, East Devon
- Holcombe, Teignbridge
- Holcombe Burnell
- Holcombe Rogus
- Holne
- Holsworthy
- Honeychurch
- Honiton
- Hope Cove
- Horwood
- Huish (near Merton)
- Huish (near Instow)
- Huntsham
- Huntshaw
- Huxham

== I ==
- Iddesleigh
- Ide
- Ideford
- Ilfracombe
- Ilsington
- Instow
- Inwardleigh
- Ipplepen
- Ivybridge

== J ==
- Jacobstowe

== K ==
- Kellaton
- Kelly
- Kenn
- Kennerleigh
- Kentisbeare
- Kentisbury
- Kenton
- Kernborough
- Kilmington
- Kingscott
- Kingsbridge
- Kingskerswell
- King's Nympton
- Kingsteignton
- Kingston
- Kingswear
- Knowstone

== L ==
- Laira
- Lamerton
- Landcross
- Langage
- Landkey
- Landkey Newland
- Landscove
- Landsend
- Langtree
- Lapford
- Leigham
- Lewtrenchard
- Lifton
- Littleham, East Devon
- Littleham, North Devon
- Littlehempston
- Little Torrington
- Loddiswell
- Loxbeare
- Loxhore
- Luffincott
- Lundy
- Luppitt
- Lustleigh
- Lydford
- Lympstone
- Lynmouth
- Lynton

== M ==
- Maindea
- Malborough
- Malmsmead
- Mamhead
- Mana Butts
- Manadon
- Manaton
- Mariansleigh
- Marlcombe
- Marldon
- Marlestone
- Marwood
- Marystow
- Mary Tavy
- Meavy
- Meeth
- Meldon
- Membury
- Merrivale
- Merton
- Meshaw
- Milton Abbot
- Milton Damerel
- Modbury
- Molland
- Monkleigh
- Monkokehampton
- Monkton
- Moorhaven Village
- Morchard Bishop
- Morebath
- Moretonhampstead
- Mortehoe
- Morwellham
- Musbury

== N ==
- Newton Abbot
- Newton Ferrers
- Newton Poppleford
- Newton St Cyres
- Newton St Petrock
- Newton Tracey
- Nomansland
- Northam
- Northleigh
- Northlew
- North Molton
- North Tawton
- Noss Mayo
- Nymet Rowland
- Nymet Tracey

== O ==
- Oakford
- Offwell
- Ogwell
- Okehampton
- Otterton
- Ottery St Mary

== P ==
- Paignton
- Pancrasweek
- Parkham
- Parracombe
- Pathfinder Village
- Payhembury
- Penquit
- Penhill
- Penhay
- Penn Beacon
- Penn Moor
- Pennicknold
- Pennicott
- Pennycomequick
- Pennycross
- Pennymoor
- Penson
- Penstone
- Pennsylvania
- Peters Marland
- Peter Tavy
- Petrockstowe
- Pilton
- Pinhoe
- Plymouth
- Plympton
- Plymstock
- Plymtree
- Polsloe
- Poltimore
- Ponsworthy
- Port Bridge
- Portmore
- Poughill
- Portlemouth
- Postbridge
- Powderham
- Prawle
- Prescott
- Princetown
- Prowse
- Puddington
- Putsborough
- Pyworthy

== Q ==
- Queen's Nympton
- Quoditch

== R ==
- Rackenford
- Rattery
- Revelstoke
- Rewe
- Ringmore
- Roborough, South Hams
- Roborough, Torridge
- Rockbeare
- Romansleigh
- Rose Ash
- Rousdon
- Rushford

== S ==
- St Budeaux
- St Giles in the Heath
- St Giles in the Wood
- St Nicholas
- Salcombe
- Salcombe Regis
- Sampford Courtenay
- Sampford Peverell
- Sampford Spiney
- Sandford
- Satterleigh
- Saunton
- Scorriton
- Seaton
- Sector
- Shaldon
- Sharpham
- Shaugh Prior
- Shebbear
- Sheepstor
- Sheepwash
- Sheldon
- Sherford (near Kingsbridge)
- Sherford (new town)
- Shirwell
- Shobrooke
- Shute
- Sidbury
- Sidford
- Sidmouth
- Silverton
- Slapton
- Sourton
- South Brent
- South Knighton
- Southleigh
- South Hele
- South Huish
- South Milton
- South Molton
- South Tawton
- South Zeal
- Sowton
- Sparkwell
- Spreyton
- Starcross
- Stibb Cross
- Sticklepath
- Stockland
- Stockleigh English
- Stockleigh Pomeroy
- Stoke Canon
- Stoke Damerel
- Stoke Fleming
- Stoke Gabriel
- Stokeinteignhead
- Stokenham
- Stoke Rivers
- Stoodleigh
- Stowford
- Strete
- Sutcombe
- Swimbridge
- Sydenham Damerel (formerly South Sydenham)

== T ==
- Taddiport
- Talaton
- Tamerton Foliot
- Tavistock
- Tawstock
- Tedburn St. Mary
- Teigngrace
- Teignmouth
- Tetcott
- Thornbury
- Thorverton
- Throwleigh
- Thrushelton
- Thurlestone
- Tiddy Brook Meadows
- Tiverton
- Topsham
- Tor
- Torr
- Torre
- Torbryan
- Torcross
- Torquay
- Totnes
- Treable
- Treasbeare
- Trebick
- Trecott
- Tredown
- Trehill
- Trelawn
- Trellick
- Trentishoe
- Trevanin
- Trevenn
- Trew
- Trewyn
- Trow
- Trusham
- Twitchen

== U ==
- Uffculme
- Ugborough
- Umberleigh
- Uplowman
- Uplyme
- Upottery
- Upton Hellions
- Upton Pyne

== V ==
- Velator
- Venngreen
- Venn
- Venn Ottery
- Venny Tedburn
- Venton
- Veraby
- Virginstow

== W ==
- Whitford
- Walkhampton
- Warkleigh
- Washfield
- Washford Pyne
- Way Village
- Weare Giffard
- Weir Quay
- Welcombe
- Wembury
- Wembworthy
- West Charleton
- West Down
- Westcott
- Westleigh (Mid Devon)
- Westleigh (North Devon)
- Westward Ho!
- Wheal Anna Maria
- Wheal Betsy
- Wheal Emma
- Wheal Fanny
- Wheal Friendship
- Wheal Maria
- Wheal Josiah
- Wheal Treeby
- Whimble
- Whimple
- Whitchurch
- Whitestone
- Whiteworks
- Widecombe in the Moor
- Widworthy
- Willand
- Winkleigh
- Witheridge
- Woodacott
- Woodacott Cross
- Woodbury
- Woodbury Salterton
- Woodleigh
- Woolacombe
- Woolfardisworthy, Torridge
- Woolfardisworthy, Mid Devon
- Worlington
- Wrangaton

== Y ==
- Yarcombe
- Yarnscombe
- Yawl
- Yealmbridge
- Yealmpton
- Yelland
- Yelverton
- Yeo Mill
- Yeo Vale
- Yeoford

== Z ==
- Zeal Monachorum

== Places of interest ==
- Berry Head
- Buckfast Abbey
- Castles in Devon
- Dartmoor
- Exmoor
- Heritage railways:
  - Babbacombe Cliff Railway
  - Bideford & Instow Railway
  - Lynton & Barnstaple Railway
  - Paignton & Dartmouth Steam Railway
  - Plym Valley Railway
  - South Devon Railway
- Jurassic Coast (a World Heritage Site)
- Lundy Island

== See also ==
- List of places in England
