= Aller =

Aller may refer to:

== Places ==
=== Rivers ===
- Aller (Germany), a major river in North Germany
- Aller (Asturian river), a river in Asturias, Spain
- River Aller, a small river on Exmoor in Somerset, England
- Aller Brook, a small river in Devon, England

=== Inhabited places in the United Kingdom ===
- Aller, Devon, a village in Devon, England
- Aller, Somerset, a village and parish in Somerset, England
- Aller Park, Devon, also known as Aller, near Newton Abbot, Devon, England

=== Inhabited Places elsewhere ===
- Aller, Asturias, a municipality in Asturias, Spain

== Other uses ==
- Aller (surname)
- Aller Media, a Danish publishing company, publishers of Allers magazine
- All England Law Reports, law reports covering England and Wales, cited as All ER

== See also ==
- Allers (surname)
- Obere Aller, a municipality in Saxony-Anhalt, Germany
