= Aller (surname) =

Aller is a surname. Notable people with the surname include:

- Arvo Aller (born 1973), Estonian politician
- Carl Aller (1845–1926), Danish magazine publisher
- Eder Aller (born 2007), Spanish footballer
- Eleanor Aller, later Slatkin, née Altschuler, (1917–1995), American cellist
- Heinrich Aller (born 1947), German politician
- Laura Aller (1849–1917), Danish magazine editor and publisher
- Lawrence H. Aller (1913–2003), American astronomer
- Robert O. Aller (1930–2006), American aerospace engineer
- Rodney Aller (1916–2005), American lawyer, naval officer and masters skier
- Victor Aller (1905–1977), American pianist

== See also ==
- Allers (surname)
- Aller (disambiguation)
