= Alcester (disambiguation) =

Alcester is a town in Warwickshire, England.

Alcester may also refer to:

- Alcester, Dorset, England
- Alcester, South Dakota, US
- Alcester Township, Union County, South Dakota, US, in the List of townships in South Dakota

== See also ==
- Alchester Roman Town, Oxfordshire. England
- Algester, Queensland, Australia
