= St Peter's Church, Noss Mayo =

Church in Devon, England

St Peter's Church
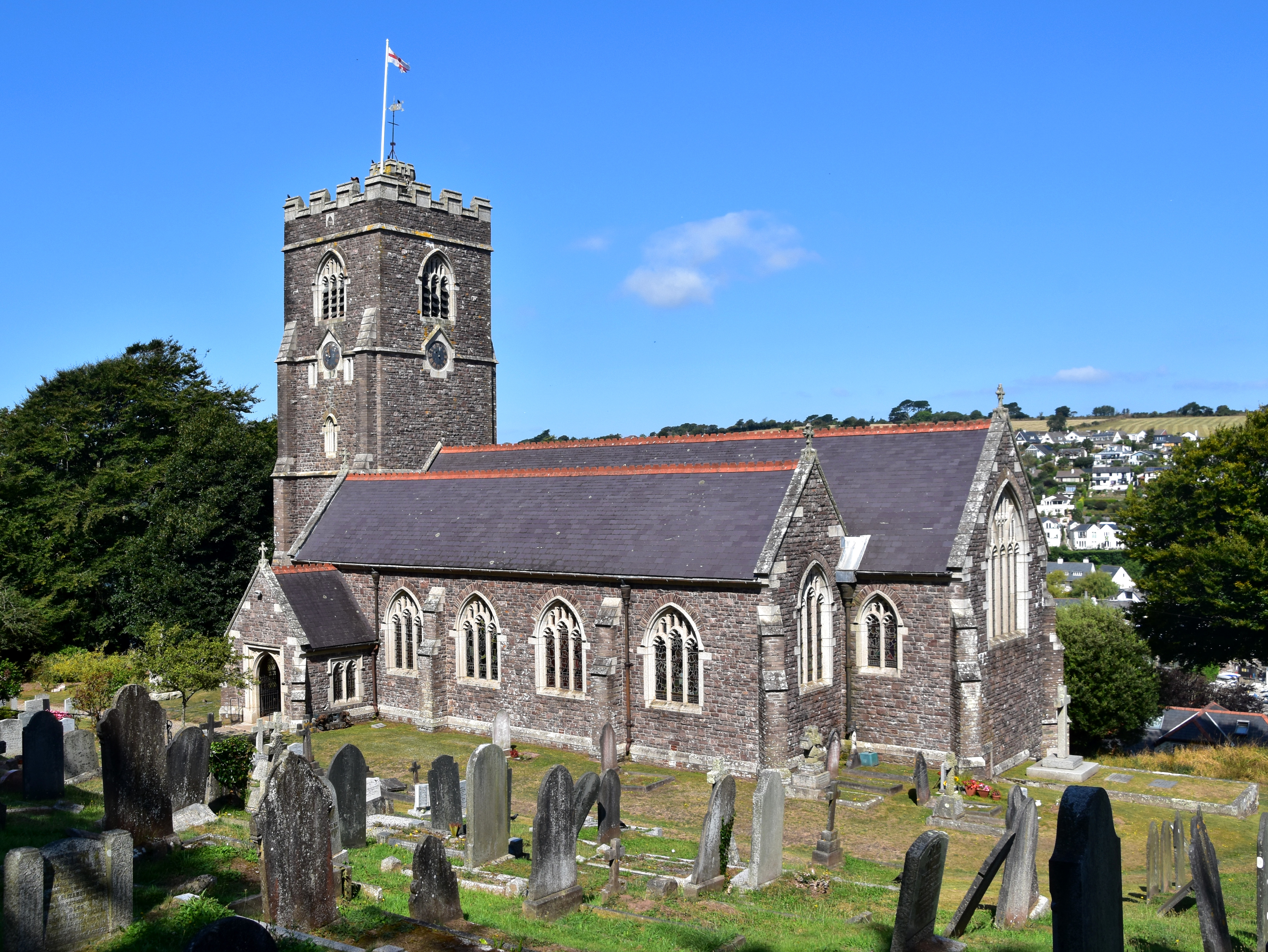

Religion
- Affiliation: Church of England
- Ecclesiastical or organizational status: Active
- Year consecrated: 1882

Location
- Location: Noss Mayo, Devon, England
- Interactive map of St Peter's Church
- Coordinates: 50.3118°N 4.0379°W

Architecture
- Architect: James Piers St Aubyn
- Type: Church

St Peter's Church is a Church of England parish church in Noss Mayo, Devon, England. It was constructed in 1880–82 and designed by the London architect James Piers St Aubyn. St Peter's has been Grade II* listed since 1960.

== History ==
St Peter's was built to replace the Church of St Peter the Poor Fisherman as parish church of Revelstoke. The existing church had become dilapidated and was at an inconvenient distance for many residents of Noss Mayo. Furthermore the chapel of ease of 1839 in the village was deemed too small to adequately serve the population as a parish church. Edward Baring, who purchased the estate of Membland in 1877, offered to construct a new church at his expense.

The foundation stone was laid on 10 September 1880 by Mrs. Edward Baring in the presence of a large crowd of spectators. Some of the clergy members present included the rector of Revelstoke, Rev. H. Farwell Roe, Rev. Duke Yonge of Newton Ferrers and the Archdeacon of Totnes, Ven. Alfred Earle. No contractor was sought for the construction of the church; local tradesmen carried out the work under the estate Clerk of works, Mr. G. W. Crosbie. Construction work had reached roof level by October 1881, and the church nearly completed when it was consecrated by the Bishop of Exeter, Frederick Temple, on 6 September 1882.

== Architecture ==
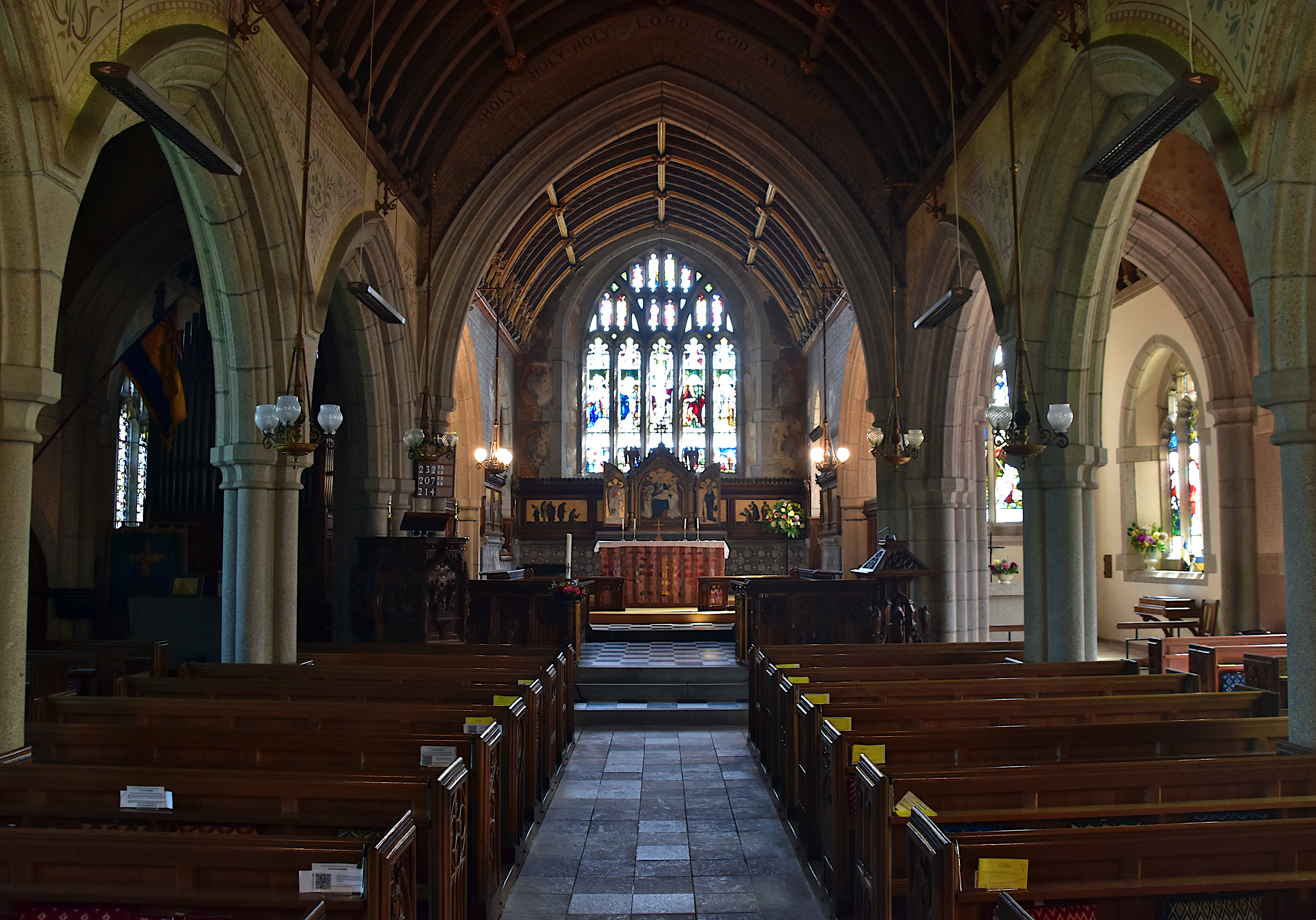
Interior of St Peter's Church.

St Peter's is built in the Perpendicular style and was designed to accommodate 250 persons. It cost approximately £14,000 to build. The church is built of local stone with dressings in Dartmoor granite, slate roofs and woodwork in English oak. The inside is made up of a nave, north and south aisles, chancel, west tower, south-west porch and vestry. Owing to the steep site, the vestry was constructed beneath the north aisle and accessed by stairs under an apse. The embattled tower, approximately 70 feet high, contains eight bells and chiming apparatus supplied by Messrs. John Warner & Sons. The four clock faces installed below each belfry window were made by Mr. Jump of London.

Much of the interior's carved woodwork was undertaken by Mr. Harry Hems of Exeter and the organ supplied by J. W. Walker & Sons Ltd of London. Decoration of the church's interior continued throughout the decade, with much of the paintwork and stained glass being carried out to the design and under the supervision of Mr. J. T. Fouracre of Stonehouse. The ongoing work was described in 1886 by the Totnes Times and Devon News as "making the interior as elegant as the graceful lines of the edifice itself". A window memorial to Lady Revelstoke, following her death in 1892, was installed in 1893 and also supplied by Fouracre and Son.
