= Casa del Rio =

- Interactive map of the Casa del Rio area

General information
- Type: Country house
- Architectural style: Art Deco
- Location: Newton Ferrers, South Hams, Devon, England
- Coordinates: 50.31778°N 4.05194°W
- Completed: 1936
- Client: Walter Price

Casa del Rio ("House on the River") is an Art Deco house built in 1936 to a Spanish theme, on the banks of the river Yealm at Newton Ferrers, South Hams, Devon, England.

The house was commissioned by the baker Walter Price, who had visited California in the 1920s, to research the bread trade there, and had met Douglas Fairbanks and Mary Pickford at their house, Pickfair, which served as Price's inspiration. In the 1950s, the house was owned by the Berkertex family.

The house's features include a marble staircase made to look like a piano keyboard, and an outdoor swimming pool, since filled in and grassed over. The exterior is white stucco. A basement bar, pool room and cinema have been added in modern times, in the former garage.

As of 2010, the house was available to rent as a holiday residence sleeping 20. The former servants' quarters are now a separate, ten-bedroom family home. In 2013, a full episode of the BBC programme "Art Deco Icons", presented by David Heathcote, featured the house.
