= Newton and Noss =

Civil parish in Devon, England

Coordinates: 50°19′N 4°02′W

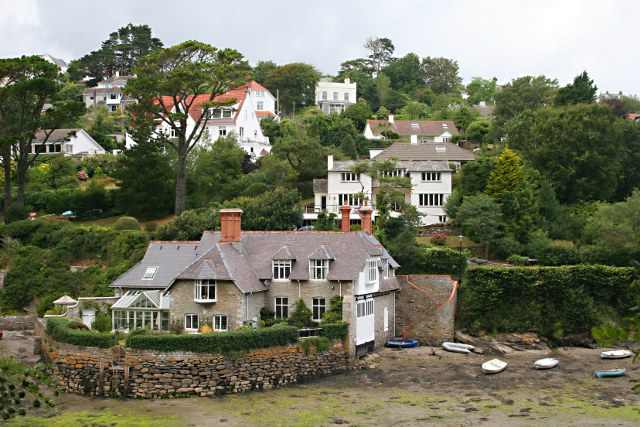
- Newton Ferrers

- Location within Devon
- Population: 1,814 (2011 census)
- Civil parish: Newton and Noss
- District: South Hams
- Shire county: Devon
- Region: South West
- Country: England
- Sovereign state: United Kingdom
- Post town: PLYMOUTH
- Postcode district: PL8
- Dialling code: 01752

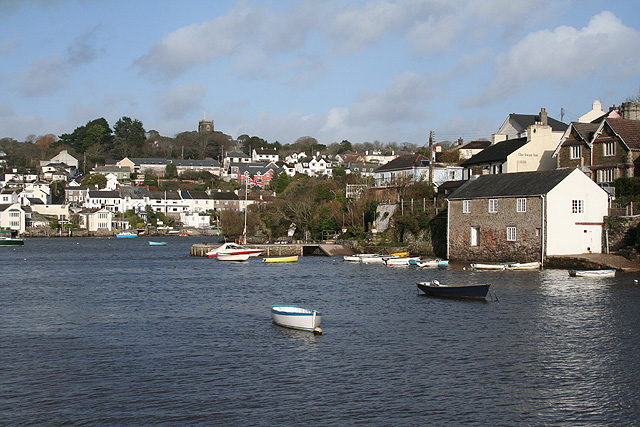
Noss Mayo and Noss Creek in the foreground.

Newton and Noss is a civil parish in the South Hams district of Devon, England comprising the villages of Newton Ferrers and Noss Mayo and outlying hamlets such as Membland. The population of the parish taken at the 2011 census was 1,814.

== History ==
In 847 AD, the Saxon King Æthelwulf created an estate for himself that stretched from the River Dart to the River Plym. In this estate there were many manors, one of which is Newton, belonging to Lord Emar. The first time that the name Newton was recorded in the naming of the Church of Newton in the Geld Roll of 1084.

The Domesday Book listed Newton in 1086 as part of the holdings of the Valletorts of Trematon, across the Tamar, who handed it to the Ferrers family. Ralph Ferrers was established at Newton in 1160 and he is the one who has given the village the family name "Ferrers".

There were sixteen villeins listed in the manor in the Domesday Book, the farmsteads of which are still recognizable today. By 1200 most of the boundaries and general landscape patterns had been established and they remained largely untouched until the end of the 19th century. One of these successful farmers, Pugh of Puslinch (Pugh's Land) acquired a farm adjacent to the manor, and his descendants expanded the estate until Puslinch was large enough to become a sub-manor, thereby establishing two manors within the parish.

The parish of Newton and Noss was formed on 1 April 1935 from "Newton Ferrers", Revelstoke and part of Holbeton.

== Description ==
The villages are situated on the mouth of the River Yealm and overlooks Hillsea Point Rock.

== Location ==
Newton and Noss lies a couple of miles south of the city of Plymouth and is surrounded by the parishes of Wembury to the west, Brixton to the northwest, Yealmpton to the northeast and Holbeton to the east. It borders the sea to the south and southwest.
