= Brithem Bottom =

Village in Devon, England

Coordinates: 50.884342°N 3.410378°W

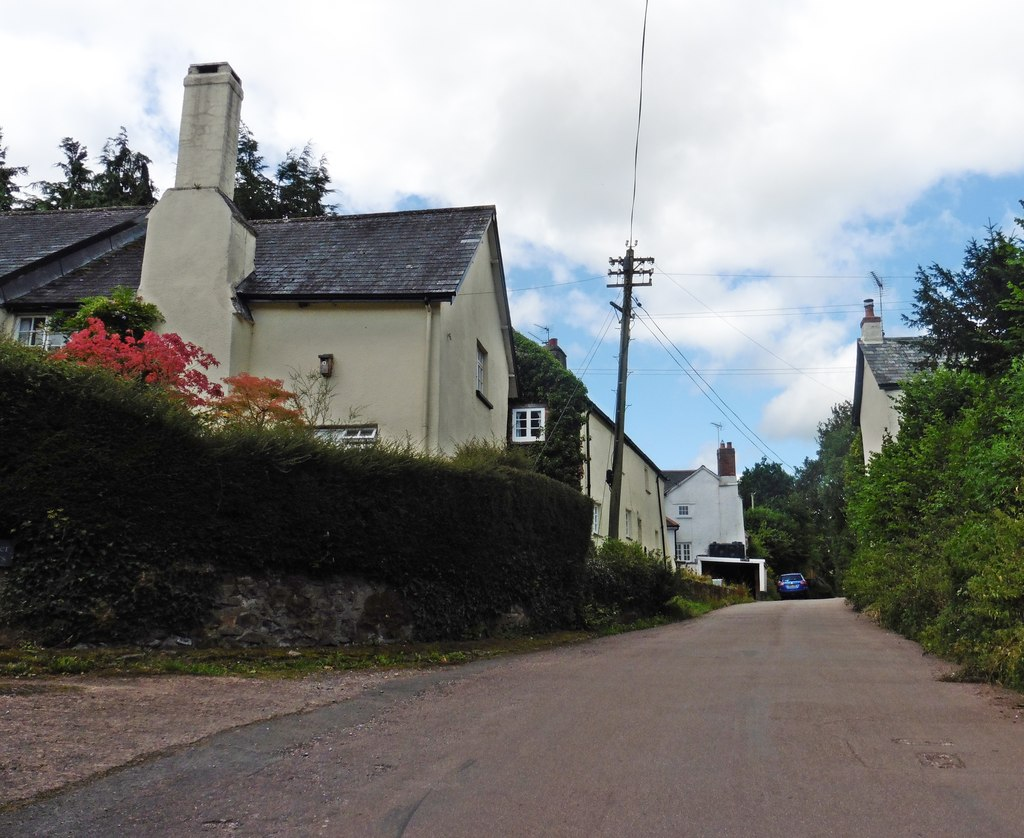
- Brithem Bottom

- Location within Devon
- OS grid reference: ST020071
- District: Mid Devon
- Shire county: Devon
- Region: South West
- Country: England
- Sovereign state: United Kingdom
- Post town: CULLOMPTON
- Postcode district: EX15
- Dialling code: 01884
- Police: Devon and Cornwall
- Fire: Devon and Somerset
- Ambulance: South Western
- UK Parliament: Honiton and Sidmouth

Brithem Bottom is a village in the civil parish of Halberton in Devon, England.

== Listed buildings ==
- Channings
- Lower Coombe Farmhouse

== Politics ==
For UK general elections, Brithem Bottom is part of the Honiton and Sidmouth constituency, currently represented by Liberal Democrat Richard Foord.

== See also ==
- List of places in Devon
