= Allers (surname) =

Allers is a surname. Notable people with the surname include:

- Arthur Allers (1875–1961), Norwegian sailor
- Christian Wilhelm Allers (1857–1915), German painter and artist
- Frank Allers, Canadian road racer
- Franz Allers (1905–1995), European-American conductor
- Kimberly Seals Allers, American journalist and author
- LaVerne Allers (born c. 1945), American football player
- Roger Allers (1949–2026), American animation director, screenwriter, playwright, animator and storyboard artist
- Rudolf Allers (1883–1963), Austrian-American psychiatrist and academic

== See also ==
- Aller (surname)
