= Revelstoke, Devon =

Former civil parish in Devon, England

Coordinates: 50.299955°N 4.017715°W

Revelstoke
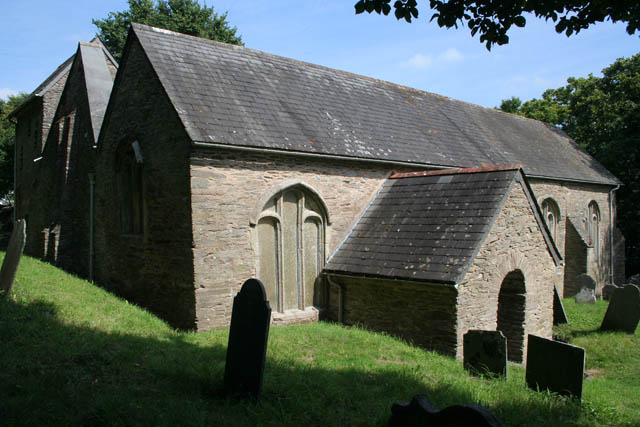
- Church of St Peter the Poor Fisherman

- Location within Devon
- Civil parish: Newton and Noss
- District: South Hams
- Shire county: Devon
- Region: South West
- Country: England
- Sovereign state: United Kingdom

Revelstoke is a former civil parish, now in the parish of Newton and Noss, in the South Hams district, in the county of Devon, England. It has a church called Church of St Peter the Poor Fisherman. The parish contained the village of Noss Mayo. It was in Plympton St Mary Rural District and located almost 2 miles south east of Newton Ferrers. In 1931 the civil parish had a population of 347. On the 1 April 1935 the parish was merged to create Newton and Noss.

== History ==
The name "Revelstoke" means 'Outlying farm/settlement' with the incorporation of the Revel family name'.
