= Westcott, Devon =

Hamlet in Devon, England

Coordinates: 50.830662°N 3.388865°W

Westcott
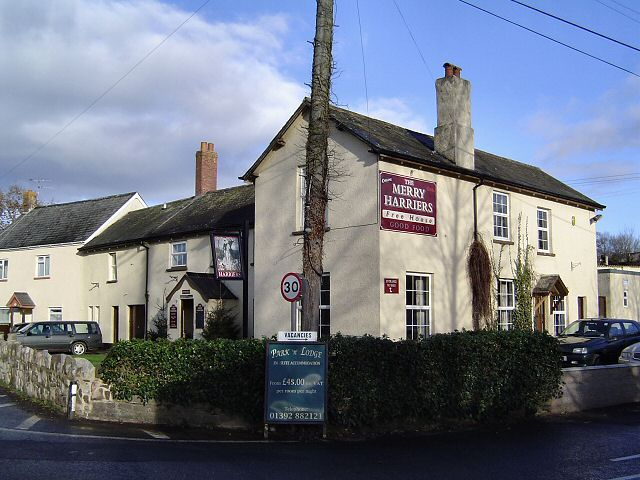
- The Merry Harriers, Westcott in 2005

- Location within Devon
- Civil parish: Cullompton
- District: Mid Devon
- Shire county: Devon
- Region: South West
- Country: England
- Sovereign state: United Kingdom
- Post town: EXETER
- Postcode district: EX
- Police: Devon and Cornwall
- Fire: Devon and Somerset
- Ambulance: South Western
- UK Parliament: Honiton and Sidmouth

Westcott is a hamlet in the civil parish of Cullompton, in the Mid Devon district, in the county of Devon, England. It is located south of the town of Cullompton.

== History ==
Westcott is located off the M5 motorway.

== Notable buildings ==
- Merry Harriers Inn, a 16th century pub
- Palmer's Farm
- Lower Westcott Cottages

== See also ==
- List of places in Devon
