= Crockernwell =

Village in Devon, England

- Village
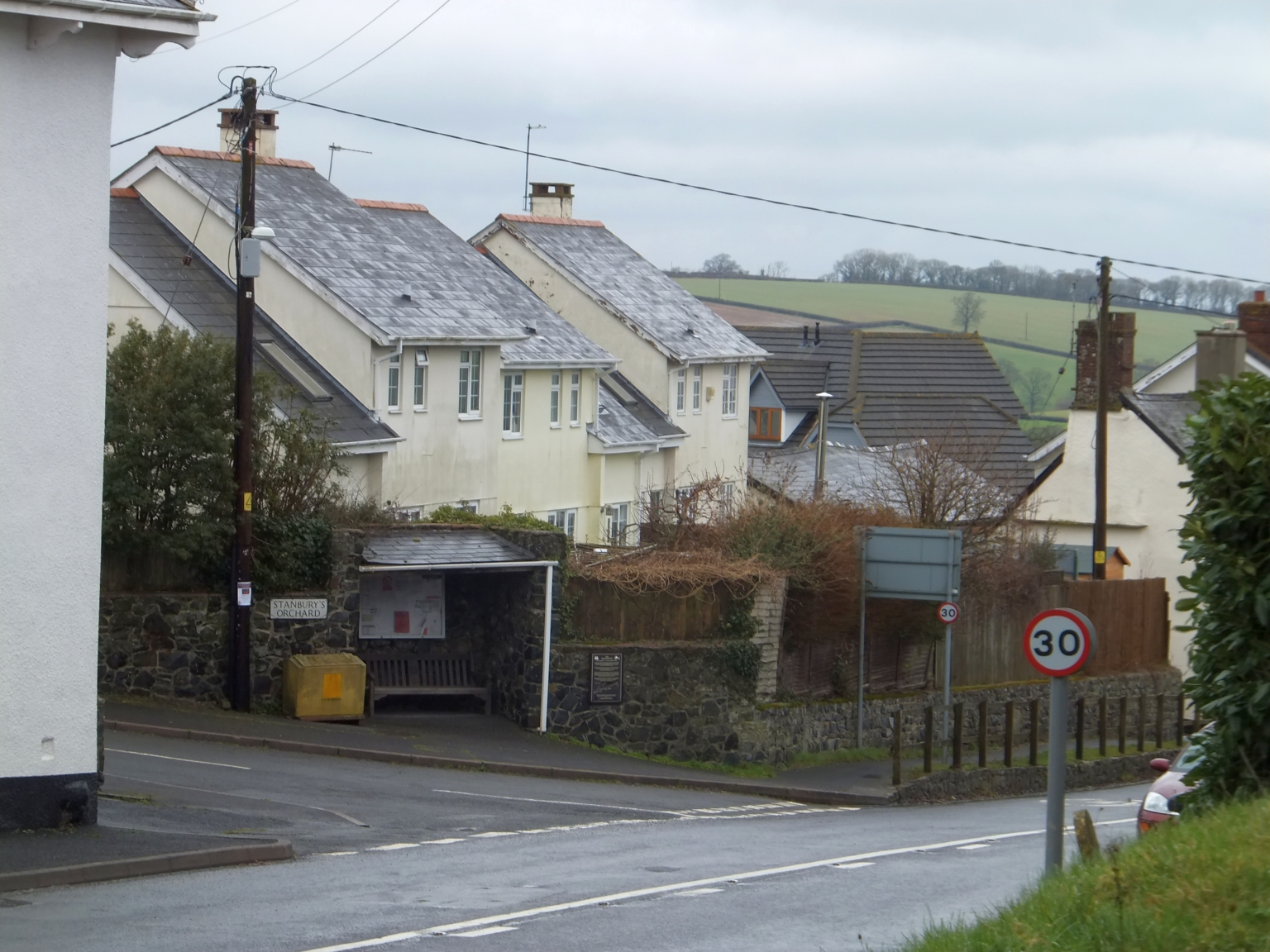
- Stanburys Orchard, Crockernwell

- Location within Devon Location within the United Kingdom
- Coordinates: 50.716°N 3.765°W
- Country: England
- County: Devon
- Time zone: UTC+0:00 (GST)

Crockernwell is a small village with a Methodist church. It is located 2 miles west of Cheriton Bishop and 12 miles west of Exeter, Devon, England.

== See also ==
- List of places in Devon
