= Pennicott =

Pennicott is a surname. Notable people with the surname include:

- Brian Pennicott (1938–2025), British Army officer
- George Pennicott (1897–1966), Australian rules footballer
- Tivon Pennicott, American composer, orchestrator, and tenor saxophonist
