= Smallridge =

Hamlet in Devon, England

Coordinates: 50.80432°N 2.99271°W

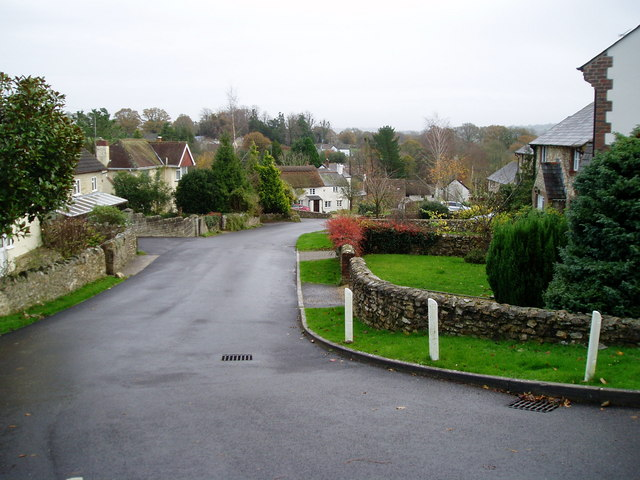
- Smallridge

- Location within Devon
- OS grid reference: ST301010
- Civil parish: All Saints
- Shire county: Devon
- Region: South West
- Country: England
- Sovereign state: United Kingdom
- Post town: AXMINSTER
- Postcode district: EX13
- Police: Devon and Cornwall
- Fire: Devon and Somerset
- Ambulance: South Western
- UK Parliament: Honiton and Sidmouth

Smallridge is a villagein All Saints parish in the East Devon district of Devon, England. The hamlet is situated about 1 mile north of the town of Axminster. It is close to the A358 road, and is within the Blackdown Hills Area of Outstanding Natural Beauty.

It used to have a village pub, however this is now a 'country hotel' restaurant, The Ridgeway Inn.
