= Alfrick Pound =

Village in Worcestershire, England

Coordinates: 52.166536°N 2.376523°W

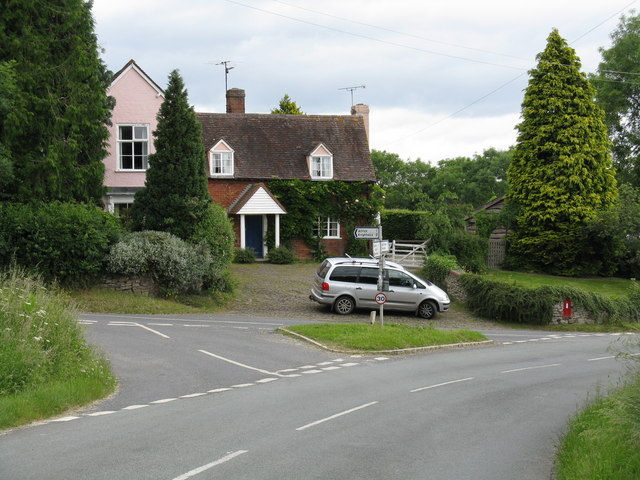

- Location within Worcestershire
- OS grid reference: SO744521
  - London: 108 miles (174 km)
- Civil parish: Alfrick
- District: Malvern Hills
- Shire county: Worcestershire
- Region: West Midlands
- Country: England
- Sovereign state: United Kingdom
- Post town: WORCESTER
- Postcode district: WR6
- Dialling code: 01886
- Police: West Mercia
- Fire: Hereford and Worcester
- Ambulance: West Midlands

Alfrick Pound is a small village in the county of Worcestershire, England, in the United Kingdom. It is part of the civil parish of Alfrick, which in 2021 had a population of 528.

== Location ==
Alfrick Pound village is located on the edge of the Malvern Hills area, approximately ten miles west of Worcester near the Suckley Hills and is set in a very rural area.

== History and amenities ==
It has a very small population of residents and a small number of properties. History tells us that the Alfrick Pound was once an area where stray livestock were held in a pound until the owner was traced or turned up to reclaim them, incurring a small fine in order to do so.

Many of the original houses that stand are half-timbered cottages, an old pub (once called the Wobbly Wheel Inn), a small village school, bakery and even a small police house. None of these are still used for their original purpose and have been modernised and made into private residences though still revealing their old architecture.

A small lane opposite the old Wobbly wheel Inn leads up to the Knapp Nature Reserve.
