= Pickfair =

Mansion and estate in California

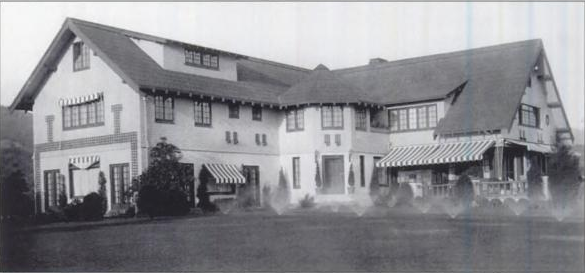
- Pickfair, 1920.

General information
- Architectural style: Mock Tudor
- Location: 1143 Summit Drive, Beverly Hills, California
- Coordinates: 34°5′25.5″N 118°25′10.5″W
- Construction started: 1919
- Completed: 1920
- Demolished: 1990

Technical details
- Floor count: 4
- Floor area: 25 rooms

Design and construction
- Architects: Horatio Cogswell, Wallace Neff

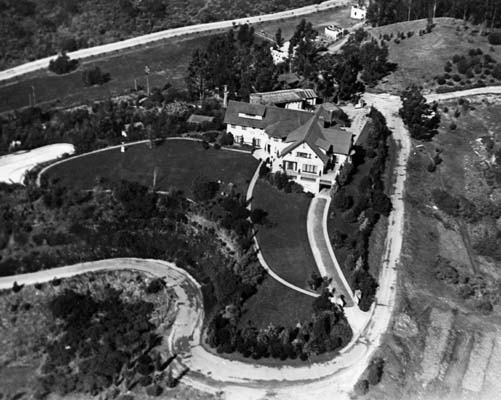
Aerial view of Pickfair, 1920.

Pickfair is a mansion and estate in the city of Beverly Hills, California. The original Pickfair was an 18-acre (7.3 ha) estate designed by architect Horatio Cogswell for attorney Lee Allen Phillips of Berkeley Square as a country home. Phillips sold the property to actor Douglas Fairbanks in 1918. Dubbed "Pickfair" by the press, it became one of the most celebrated houses in the world. Life described Pickfair as "a gathering place only slightly less important than the White House... and much more fun."

== History ==
=== Construction and renovation (1919–1920s) ===
Located at 1143 Summit Drive in San Ysidro Canyon in Beverly Hills, the property was a hunting lodge when purchased by Fairbanks in 1919 for his bride-to-be, Mary Pickford. In the 1920s, the newlyweds extensively renovated the lodge, transforming it into a four-story, 25-room mansion complete with stables, servants quarters, tennis courts, a large guest wing, and garages.

Remodeled by Wallace Neff in a mock Tudor style, it took five years to complete. Ceiling frescos, parquet flooring, wood-paneled halls of fine mahogany and bleached pine, gold leaf, and mirrored decorative niches, all added to the authentic charm of Pickfair. The property was said to have been the first private home in the Los Angeles area to include an in-ground swimming pool, in which Pickford and Fairbanks were famously photographed paddling a canoe.

Pickfair featured a collection of early 18th-century English and French period furniture, decorative arts, and antiques. Notable pieces in the collection included furniture from the Barberini Palace, the Baroness Burdett-Coutts estate in London, and Louis XVI furniture from the Countess Rodezno and Lord Leverhulme collections. The highlight of any visit to Pickfair was a large collection of Chinese objets d'art collected by Fairbanks and Pickford on their many visits to the Orient. The Pickfair art collection was wide and varied and included paintings by Philip Mercier, Guillaume Seignac, George Romney, and Paul de Longpré.

The mansion also featured an Old West-style saloon complete with an ornate burnished mahogany bar obtained from a saloon in Auburn, California, and paintings by Frederic Remington. In the 1970 Volume 2, Number 10 issue of Mankind Magazine it states there were twelve Remingtons from 1907 purchased from the Cosmopolitan Publishing Company that "were Mary Pickford's gift to her husband, Charles 'Buddy' Rogers". The interior of Pickfair was decorated and updated throughout the years by Marilyn Johnson Tucker, Elsie De Wolfe, Marjorie Requa, Tony Duquette, and Kathryn Crawford.

=== Hollywood's social center (1920s–1930s) ===
During the 1920s, the house became a focal point for Hollywood's social activities, and the couple became famous for entertaining there. An invitation to Pickfair was a sign of social acceptance into the closed Hollywood community. In 1928, Will Rogers said "My most important duty as mayor of Beverly Hills is directing people to Mary Pickford's house".

Dinners at Pickfair became legendary; guests included Charlie Chaplin (who lived next door), the Duke of Windsor and Duchess of Windsor, Dorothy and Lillian Gish, Mildred Harris, Greta Garbo, George Bernard Shaw, Albert Einstein, Elinor Glyn, Helen Keller, H.G. Wells, Lord Louis Mountbatten, Fritz Kreisler, Tony Duquette, Amelia Earhart, F. Scott Fitzgerald, Joan Crawford, Noël Coward, President Franklin D. Roosevelt and Eleanor Roosevelt, Pearl S. Buck, Charles Lindbergh, Max Reinhardt, Arthur Conan Doyle, Thomas Edison, Gloria Swanson, the Duke and Duchess of Alba, the King and Queen of Siam, Austen Chamberlain, Vladimir Nemirovich-Danchenko,

=== Later years (1936–1979) ===
Fairbanks and Pickford divorced in January 1936, but Pickford continued to reside in the mansion with her third husband, actor and musician Charles "Buddy" Rogers, until her death in 1979. Pickford received few visitors in her later years, but continued to open up her grand home for charitable organizations and parties, including an annual Christmas party for blind war veterans, mostly from World War I.

In 1976, Pickford received a second Academy Award for contribution to American film. The Academy Honorary Award was presented to her in the formal living room of Pickfair, and televised on the 48th Academy Awards. Introduced and narrated by Gene Kelly, it gave the public a rare glimpse inside the fabled mansion.

=== Sale, demolition, and rebuild (1979–present) ===
Empty for several years after Pickford's death in 1979, Pickfair was eventually sold to Los Angeles Lakers owner Jerry Buss, who continued to care for the home, updating and preserving much of its unique charm. In 1988, it was purchased by actress Pia Zadora and her husband Meshulam Riklis. They announced they were planning renovations to the famous estate, but revealed in 1990 that they had in fact demolished Pickfair and a new larger "Venetian style palazzo" was going to be constructed in its place. In 1990, the Los Angeles Times reported that all but the guest wing and part of the living room had been razed.

Faced with harsh criticism from a nostalgic public, including Douglas Fairbanks, Jr., Zadora defended her family's actions, stating that the house was allegedly in a poor state of repair and was infested by termites. In the L.A. Times, Fairbanks was quoted as saying, "I regret it very much. I wonder, if they were going to demolish it, why they bought it in the first place."

In 2012, Zadora claimed on the BIO channel's Celebrity Ghost Stories that the real reason she demolished Pickfair was not due to termite infestation but because it was haunted by the laughing ghost of a woman who allegedly died there while having an affair with the elder Fairbanks. Defending her actions, Zadora explained, "If I had a choice, I never would have torn down this old home. I loved this home, it had a history, it had a very important sense about it and you can deal with termites, and you can deal with plumbing issues, but you can't deal with the supernatural."

Remaining artifacts from the original Pickfair include the gates to the estate, the kidney-shaped pool and pool house, remnants of the living room, and the two-bedroom guest wing that played host to visiting royalty and notable film celebrities for over half a century. The guest wing was once used as a honeymoon suite for Lord Louis and Lady Mountbatten.

Located at 1143 Summit Drive in Beverly Hills, UNICOM Global bought the mansion on April 19, 2005, for $15,000,000. The property included a gym, disco room, and sits on 2.25 acres (0.91 ha). UNICOM Global now uses it for meetings, conferences and events.

== See also ==
- Casa del Rio, a house in Devon, England, inspired by Pickfair.
