= Ale Oak =

Hamlet in Shropshire, England

Coordinates: 52.447°N 3.142°W

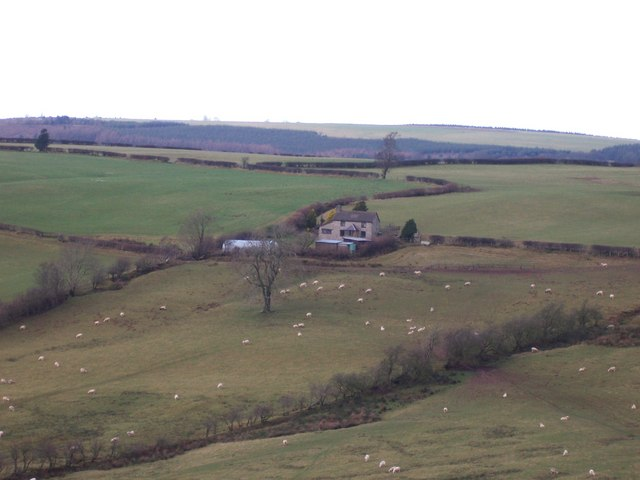
- A cottage at Ale Oak

- Location within Shropshire
- OS grid reference: SO223838
- Civil parish: Bettws-y-Crwyn
- Unitary authority: Shropshire
- Ceremonial county: Shropshire
- Region: West Midlands
- Country: England
- Sovereign state: United Kingdom
- Post town: CRAVEN ARMS
- Postcode district: SY7
- Dialling code: 01588
- Police: West Mercia
- Fire: Shropshire
- Ambulance: West Midlands
- UK Parliament: Ludlow

Ale Oak is a hamlet in Shropshire, England.
