= Rodney Aller =

American lawyer (1916–2005)

Rodney Goddard Aller (October 24, 1916 – March 21, 2005) was an American lawyer, naval officer and masters skier.

He won several medals in masters skiing, including four gold medals in World Championship Masters Skiing in 2002 in Abetone, Italy. He died of pneumonia in 2005.

Aller graduated from Princeton University in 1938 where he played rugby, earned a law degree from Yale Law School and served in the United States Navy during World War II.
