= Bantham Cross =

Hamlet in Devon, England

Coordinates: 50.298°N 3.819°W

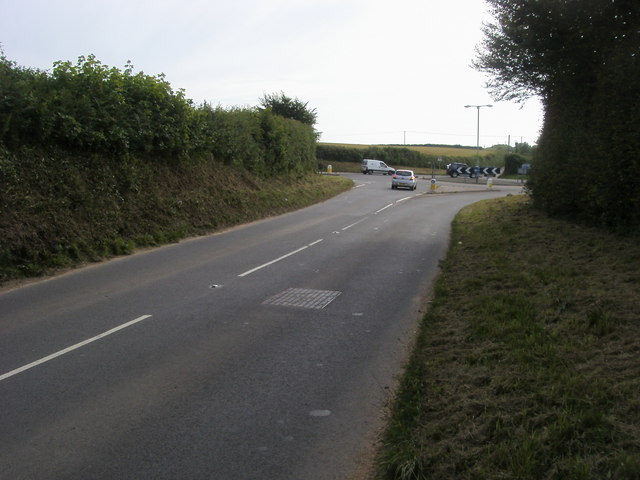
- Approach to Bantham Cross roundabout

- Location within Devon
- OS grid reference: SX705457
  - London: 182 miles (293 km) ENE
- Civil parish: Churchstow
- District: South Hams
- Shire county: Devon
- Region: South West
- Country: England
- Sovereign state: United Kingdom
- Post town: Kingsbridge
- Postcode district: TQ7
- Dialling code: 01548
- Police: Devon and Cornwall
- Fire: Devon and Somerset
- Ambulance: South Western
- UK Parliament: Totnes

Bantham Cross is a tiny hamlet near Churchstow, in Devon, England. There are a few buildings in it, and a roundabout. The buildings are sparse and are part of Elston, Offields, Osborne Newton and Nuckwell farms.
