= Allen End =

Coordinates: 52.567°N 1.757°W

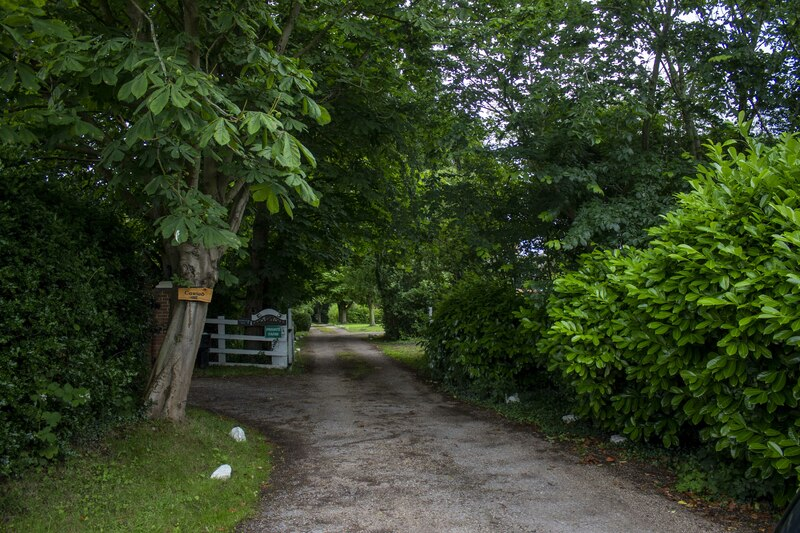
- Track to Allen End Farm

- Location within Warwickshire
- OS grid reference: SP1696
- Civil parish: Middleton
- District: North Warwickshire
- Shire county: Warwickshire
- Region: West Midlands
- Country: England
- Sovereign state: United Kingdom
- Post town: Sutton Coldfield
- Postcode district: B75
- Police: Warwickshire
- Fire: Warwickshire
- Ambulance: West Midlands

Allen End is a hamlet in the civil parish of Middleton, in Warwickshire, England.
