= Alder's End =

Village in Herefordshire, England

Coordinates: 52.0564°N 2.5515°W

Alder's End Farm

Alder's End is a hamlet in Herefordshire, England. It is about 8 miles (13 km) east of Hereford and is near the A438 road. The village falls within the Tarrington parish.
