= Albyfield =

Hamlet in Cumbria, England

Coordinates: 54.86°N 2.71°W

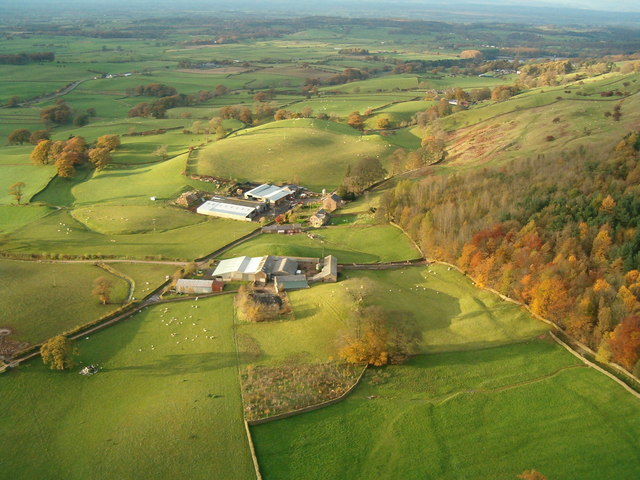
- An aerial view of Albyfield Farm

- Location in the former Carlisle district, Cumbria Location within Cumbria
- OS grid reference: NY5452
- Civil parish: Cumrew
- Unitary authority: Cumberland
- Ceremonial county: Cumbria
- Region: North West
- Country: England
- Sovereign state: United Kingdom
- Post town: BRAMPTON
- Postcode district: CA8
- Dialling code: 01768
- Police: Cumbria
- Fire: Cumbria
- Ambulance: North West
- UK Parliament: Carlisle

Albyfield is a hamlet in Cumbria, England.
