= Church of St Peter the Poor Fisherman, Revelstoke =

Church in Devon, England

Church of St Peter the Poor Fisherman
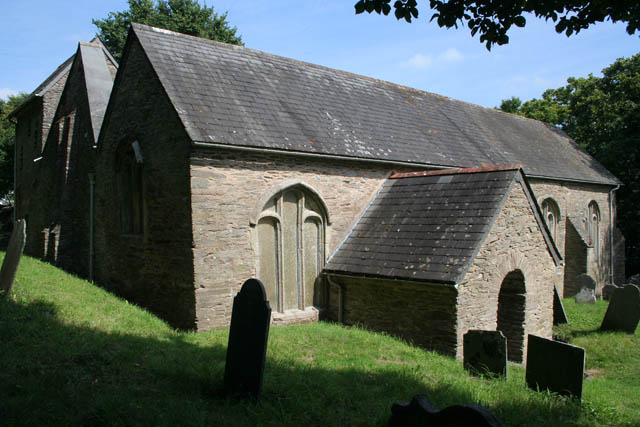

- Location within Devon
- 50.3003°N 4.0177°W
- Location: Revelstoke, Noss Mayo, Devon, England

History
- Built: 1226

Listed Building – Grade I
- Official name: Church of St Peter the Poor Fisherman
- Designated: 19 July 1984
- Reference no.: 1107794

The Church of St Peter the Poor Fisherman in the village of Noss Mayo, in Devon, England, was built in 1226. It is located in the former civil parish of Revelstoke. It is recorded in the National Heritage List for England as a designated Grade I listed building, and is a redundant church in the care of the Churches Conservation Trust. It was declared redundant on 6 April 1971, and was vested in the Trust on 28 June 1972.

The mediaeval church has Saxon origins with portions being built in the 13th, 14th and 15th centuries. The aisle and the porch still have their carved wagon roofs; however, the roofs have fallen down over the rest of the building.

In 1880–82 a new church, also dedicated to St Peter, was built nearby and this church fell into disrepair. It is still consecrated and occasional services are held in the church during the summer.

== See also ==
- List of churches preserved by the Churches Conservation Trust in South West England
