= Kimberly Seals Allers =

American author

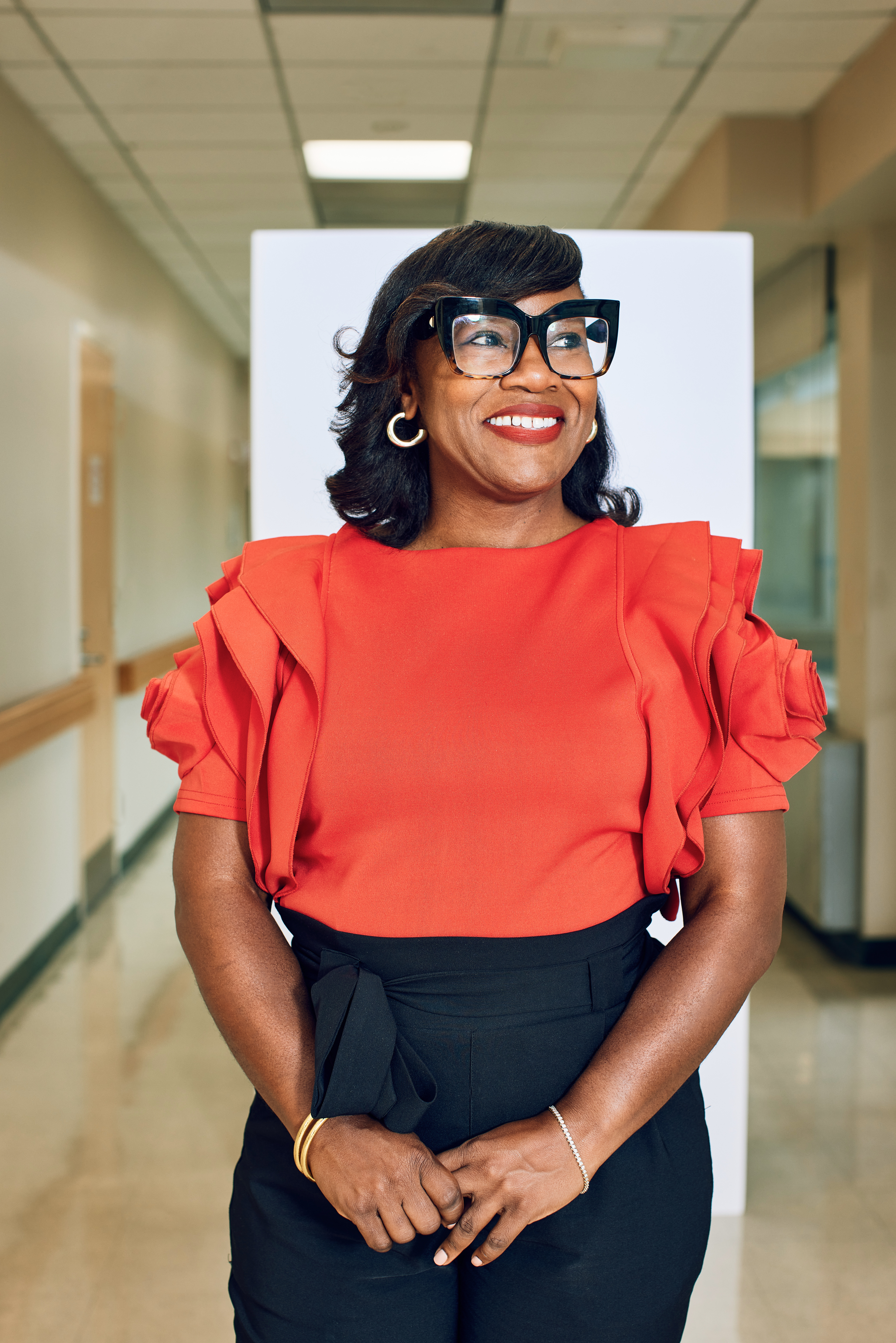
- Occupation: Author
- Notable work: The Mocha Manual to a Fabulous Pregnancy

Kimberly Seals Allers is an American journalist, author, entrepreneur, and maternal and infant health strategist.

Allers is a former writer for Fortune magazine and senior editor at Essence. Allers has authored five books on maternal and infant health.

== Career ==
Allers is the founder of New York City-based Narrative Nation, a media and technology nonprofit that addresses racial disparities in maternal and infant health.

The first project developed out of Narrative Nation, was the Irth app, a Yelp-like community-based app for Black and Brown women to find and review prenatal, birthing, postpartum and pediatric care experiences.

Allers has authored five books on maternal and infant health. Her first book written in 2005, The Mocha Manual to a Fabulous Pregnancy was nominated for an NAACP Image Award.

Allers's 2017 book, The Big Letdown, How Medicine, Big Business, and Feminism Undermine Breastfeeding combines research and personal stories on the importance of breastfeeding in the U.S.

Allers is the host of the Birthright podcast, launched in 2021. The podcast features positive Black birth stories told from multiple perspectives.

Allers created the Black Birthing Joyline, a phone number people can call to hear joyful stories about birth from people who have been guests on her podcast.
