= Aldington Frith =

Village in Kent, England

Coordinates: 51.0949°N 0.9142°E

- Location within Kent
- OS grid reference: TR0436
- Shire county: Kent
- Region: South East
- Country: England
- Sovereign state: United Kingdom
- Police: Kent
- Fire: Kent
- Ambulance: South East Coast

Aldington Frith is a village in Kent, England, south of Ashford.
