= Tiddy Brook Meadows, Devon =

Village in Devon, England

Coordinates: 50.533235°N 4.1374540°W

Tiddy Brook Meadows
- Location within Devon
- Population: 500
- OS grid reference: SX 48629 72539
- District: West Devon
- Shire county: Devon
- Region: South West
- Country: England
- Sovereign state: United Kingdom
- Post town: TAVISTOCK
- Postcode district: PL19
- Dialling code: 01822
- Police: Devon and Cornwall
- Fire: Devon and Somerset
- Ambulance: South Western
- UK Parliament: Torridge and West Devon

Tiddy Brook Meadows,(sometimes called Tiddybrook Meadows) is a settlement in Devon. It lies south of Whitchurch and just east of Tavistock, and sits on the banks of the river Tiddy Brook, which flows into the River Tavy. Most of the settlement was built in the late 2000s.

== Services ==
Tiddy Brook Meadows only officially has a bus stop, however shopping wise Tavistock Town Centre and Whitchurch stores, which includes a Post Office, are within walking distance. The area is served by Devon and Cornwall Police and the Devon and Somerset Fire and Rescue Service. The nearest hospital is Derriford Hospital, although there is a small clinic in Tavistock.

== Building controversy ==
Many residents of nearby Whitchurch, Devon were upset with the extended building of homes, which occurred between 2007 and 2013 in the Tiddy Brook Meadows area because the area where the new homes were built was originally designated as a natural area bordering Whitchurch by the West Devon Borough Council. Many others have criticised the site of the new buildings because it lies on a Floodplain, which leaves the area prone to flooding. Also it has been criticised for causing congestion on smaller roads in the area. In October 2016 it was announced that British house building company Redrow were planning to fill out the Meadow by building at least 110 homes, further increasing criticism from locals, especially those from Whitchurch.
