= Folly Gate =

Village in Devon, England

Coordinates: 50.763°N 4.024°W

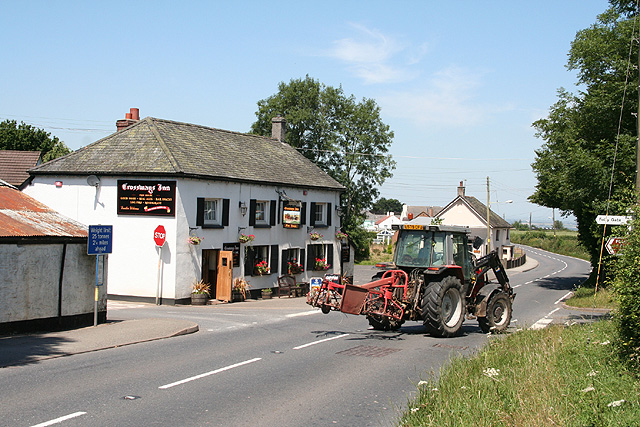
Inn in Folly Gate, 2006

Folly Gate is a village in the civil parish of Inwardleigh, in the West Devon district, in the county of Devon, England. It is situated near Okehampton. An airfield existed near the village between 1928 and 1960, it is now a field. In 1986 the village contained about 100 houses and had a population of 230.
