= Alisary =

Coordinates: 56.84°N 05.70°W

- Location within the Lochaber area
- OS grid reference: NM7479
- Council area: Highland
- Country: Scotland
- Sovereign state: United Kingdom
- Police: Scotland
- Fire: Scottish
- Ambulance: Scottish

Alisary is a tiny settlement in Highland, Scotland.
