= George Pennicott =

Australian rules footballer

Personal information
- Full name: Richard George Pennicott
- Born: 29 September 1897; Oatlands, Tasmania
- Died: 8 September 1966 (aged 68); Oatlands, Tasmania
- Original team: Oatlands / Tatura
- Height: 192 cm (6 ft 4 in)
- Weight: 96 kg (212 lb)

Playing career^{1}
Years	Club	Games (Goals)
1923	St Kilda	1 (0)
- ^{1} Playing statistics correct to the end of 1923.

George Pennicott also known as Richard George Pennicott (29 September 1897 – 8 September 1966) was an Australian rules footballer who played with St Kilda in the Victorian Football League (VFL).

== Height and Weight ==
Richard George Pennicott's height and weight are 192 cm and 96 kg respectively.
