= Golland =

Golland is a surname. Notable people with this surname include:

- David Hamilton Golland (born 1971), American historian
- Gregor Golland (born 1974), German politician
- John Golland (1942–1993), English composer
- Jonas Golland, British musician, drummer for The Tiger Lillies
- Joseph Golland, actor in The Trap (1966 film)
- Norman Golland, American criminal, accomplice in murder of entertainer J. Walter Leopold
- Polina Golland (born 1971), Israeli-American computer scientist
- Stuart Golland (1945–2003), English actor
- Yvonne Golland, English cricketer
