= Inwardleigh =

Village in Devon, England

Coordinates: 50.775793°N 4.0423182°W

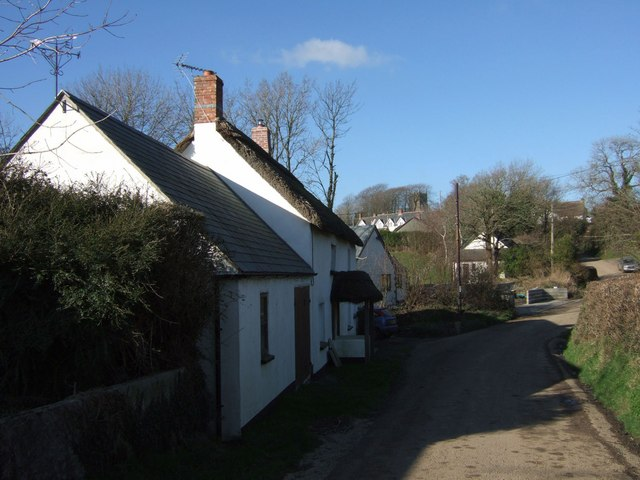

- Location within Devon
- Area: 26.6301 km^{2} (10.2819 sq mi)
- Population: 491 (2011 census)
  - Density: 18/km^{2} (47/sq mi)
- Civil parish: Inwardleigh
- District: West Devon
- Shire county: Devon
- Region: South West
- Country: England
- Sovereign state: United Kingdom
- Police: Devon and Cornwall
- Fire: Devon and Somerset
- Ambulance: South Western
- Website: http://www.inwardleigh.org.uk/index.php

Inwardleigh is a village and civil parish about 3 1/2 miles north north west of Okehampton railway station, in the West Devon district, in the county of Devon, England. The parish contains the village of Folly Gate. The A386 road runs through the parish. In 2011 the parish had a population of 491. The parish touches Hatherleigh, Sampford Courtenay, Okehampton Hamlets, Jacobstowe and Northlew.

== Features ==
There are 17 listed buildings in Inwardleigh.

== History ==
Inwardleigh was recorded in the Domesday Book as Lege/Lega. The name means 'Wood/clearing', with the "Inwar" part being a personal name. It was formerly called Ingerley. The parish was historically in the Black Torrington hundred.
