= Alne End =

Village in Warwickshire, England

Coordinates: 52.232°N 1.835°W

- Location within Warwickshire
- OS grid reference: SP1159
- Shire county: Warwickshire
- Region: West Midlands
- Country: England
- Sovereign state: United Kingdom
- Post town: Alcester
- Postcode district: B49
- Police: Warwickshire
- Fire: Warwickshire
- Ambulance: West Midlands

Alne End is a village in Warwickshire, England. Population details can be found under Great Alne.
