= Newton Ferrers =

Village in Devon, England

Coordinates: 50°18′52″N 4°02′31″W

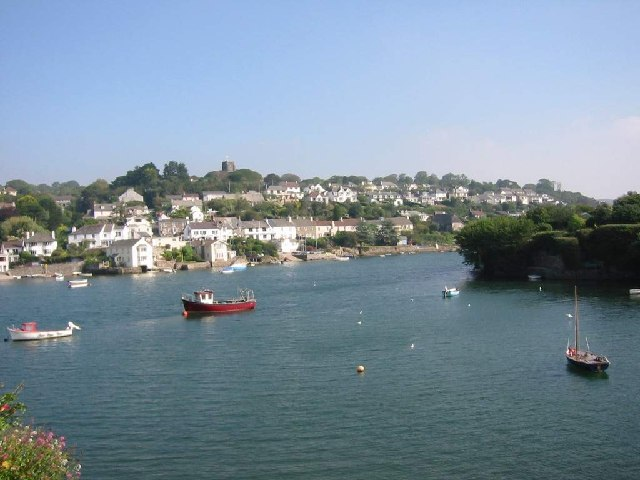
- Newton Ferrers as seen across Newton Creek from Noss Mayo

- Location within Devon
- Civil parish: Newton and Noss
- District: South Hams
- Shire county: Devon
- Region: South West
- Country: England
- Sovereign state: United Kingdom
- Post town: PLYMOUTH
- Postcode district: PL8

Newton Ferrers is a village and former manor, civil and ecclesiastical parish, now in the parish of Newton and Noss, in the South Hams district, in the county of Devon, England. It is situated on a creek of the River Yealm estuary, about 6 miles (10 km) south-east of the City of Plymouth. It lies within the South Devon Area of Outstanding Natural Beauty. According to the United Kingdom Census 2011 the population of the village of Newton Ferrers was 1,268 and that of the electoral ward of Newton and Noss was 1,814.

== History ==
The manor of Newton Ferrers is listed in the 1086 Domesday Book as Niwetone. It was granted to a branch of the Norman family of de Ferrers, after which the manor and village became known as Newton Ferrers. It was probably the birthplace of the notorious 17th-century pirate Henry Every.

In 1931 the parish had a population of 884. On 1 April 1935 the parish was abolished to form "Newton and Noss", part also went to Yealmpton.

== Churches ==
Holy Cross Church, Newton Ferrers, the parish church, was re-built in 1260. It was less than half the size of the present building and in 1342 was enlarged by the then rector, Henry de Ferrers. It received a Victorian restoration by George Fellowes Prynne in 1885–6 and only the west tower and the north and south arcades remain of the medieval structure.

Across the creek in the former parish of Noss Mayo St Peter's Church was built in 1880–82 by Edward Baring, 1st Baron Revelstoke of Membland, and took over from the nearby Church of St Peter the Poor Fisherman, Revelstoke, built in 1226. All three churches were ministered by Rev. Jonathan Cruickshank.

== Amenities ==
The village's shops are on Newton Hill: there is a co-op; a Post Office selling fruit, veg, magazines and clothes; a pharmacy; and an estate agent. There is also a cafe and another estate agent on Parsonage Road. There are no shops in Noss Mayo, but it has two public houses, The Swan and The Ship. Newton Ferrers has one pub, The Dolphin, and all three are on the waterfront. During the summer a river taxi takes passengers around the two villages and makes regular trips between Newton Ferrers Harbour, Warren Point (for access to Wembury and its beach) and Noss Mayo. The art deco house Casa del Rio was built in 1936.

== Vosses ==
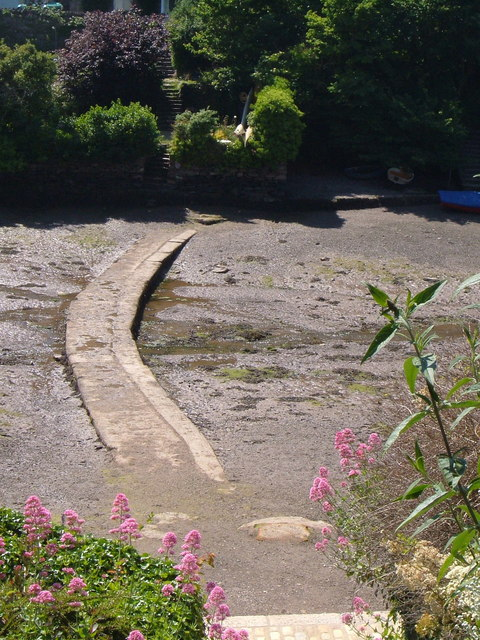
Noss Voss at low tide

At low tide there appear two "vosses", i.e. ancient solid man-made pathways across the estuary mud useable as crossing points. The Newton Voss crosses the Newton Creek between Riverside Road West below the Dolphin Inn to near the Swan Inn. The Noss Voss crosses the brook between the Swan Inn and the Ship Inn in Noss Mayo.

== Lifeboat station ==
The Royal National Lifeboat Institution established a lifeboat station at the mouth of the Newton Creek in March 1878. A stone boat house was built and the boat was launched into the River Yealm using a slipway. The station was closed in 1927 by which time Plymouth Lifeboat Station had been equipped with a motor lifeboat which could cover the area more effectively. During its 49 years three different lifeboats operated from the 'Yealm River Lifeboat Station': Bowman (1878), Darling (1887) and Michael Smart (1904).

== Twinned villages ==
Newton Ferrers has been twinned with :

- Trébeurden, France, since 2010
