= Allen's Green =

Village in Hertfordshire, England

Coordinates: 51.82°N 00.10°E

- Location within Hertfordshire
- OS grid reference: TL4516
- Shire county: Hertfordshire
- Region: East
- Country: England
- Sovereign state: United Kingdom
- Police: Hertfordshire
- Fire: Hertfordshire
- Ambulance: East of England

Allen's Green is a village in Hertfordshire, England.
