= Noss Mayo =

Village in Devon, England

Coordinates: 50°18′36″N 4°2′27″W

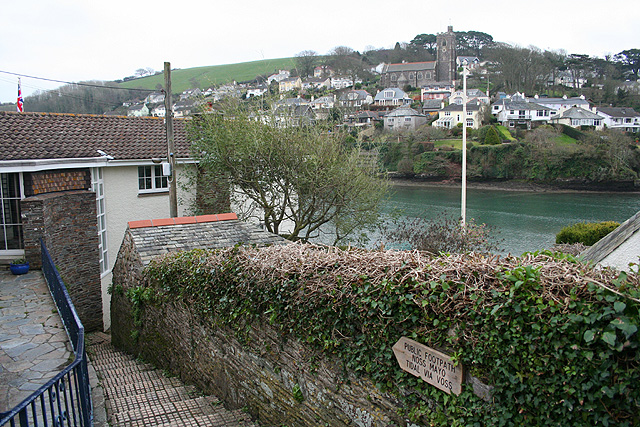
- Noss Mayo as seen across Newton Creek from Newton Ferrers

- Location within Devon
- Civil parish: Newton and Noss
- District: South Hams
- Shire county: Devon
- Region: South West
- Country: England
- Sovereign state: United Kingdom
- Post town: PLYMOUTH
- Postcode district: PL8
- Dialling code: 01752

Noss Mayo is a village in the civil parish of Newton and Noss in the South Hams district of Devon, England, 6 miles (10 km) south-east of Plymouth, one mile (1.6 km) inland on the southern bank of Newton Creek, an arm of the estuary of the River Yealm. On the opposite, northern, bank of the creek is Newton Ferrers.

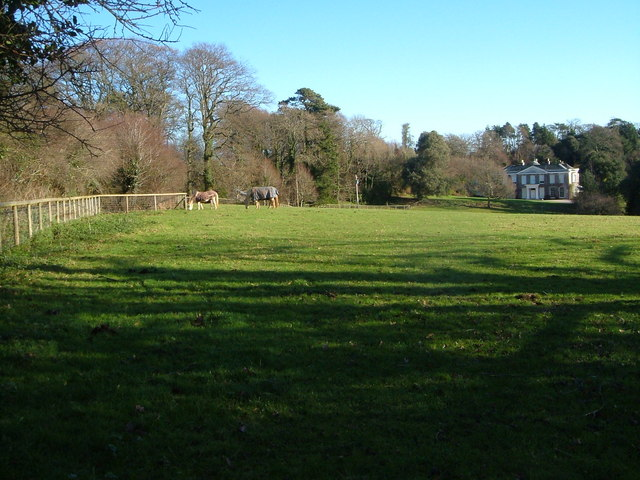
Gnaton Hall

The first documentary reference of Noss Mayo was in 1286 as Nesse Matheu. The manor here was held by Matheu son of John from 1284 to 1309.

The village's church, dedicated to Saint Peter, was built in 1880–1882 at the expense of Edward Baring, 1st Baron Revelstoke (head of Barings Bank) to a design by James Piers St Aubyn. It took over from the Church of St Peter the Poor Fisherman, Revelstoke, which was built in 1226, on the coast one mile (1.6 km) to the south.
