= Alston, East Devon =

Hamlet in Devon, England

Coordinates: 50.81°N 02.99°W

Alston
- Location within Devon
- OS grid reference: ST3002
- Shire county: Devon
- Region: South West
- Country: England
- Sovereign state: United Kingdom
- Police: Devon and Cornwall
- Fire: Devon and Somerset
- Ambulance: South Western

Alston is a hamlet in All Saints civil parish, East Devon district, Devon, England.
