= Alfrick =

Village in Worcestershire, England

Coordinates: 52.17°N 2.38°W

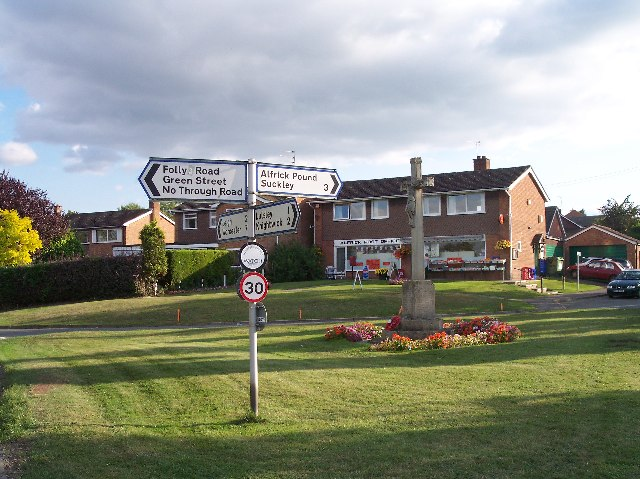

- Location within Worcestershire
- Population: 528
- OS grid reference: SO7453
  - London: 108 miles (174 km)
- Civil parish: Alfrick
- District: Malvern Hills
- Shire county: Worcestershire
- Region: West Midlands
- Country: England
- Sovereign state: United Kingdom
- Post town: Worcester
- Postcode district: WR6
- Dialling code: 01886
- Police: West Mercia
- Fire: Hereford and Worcester
- Ambulance: West Midlands

Alfrick is a village and civil parish in the Malvern Hills district of Worcestershire, England, about seven miles west of Worcester.

== Amenities ==
The 2021 census counted 528 people. Once an agricultural farming village, Alfrick is now mainly a dormitory village for nearby Worcester and Malvern.

Alfrick is probably currently best known for the annual Alfrick and Lulsley Village Show which attracts visitors from across the West Midlands.

There is a village hall and a recreational field. The war memorial on the village green lists the names of 95 men killed in war. The village shop and Post Office closed in July 2011 when the owners retired. In June 2012 The Alfrick and Lulsley Community Shop opened. It is a community-owned food shop, café and Post Office run by a part-time manager and several volunteers.

Nearby is the Knapp and Papermill nature reserve owned by the Worcestershire Wildlife Trust. In 2012 the Trust agreed to buy a small area of woodland adjoining the reserve.

== History ==
The name Alfrick derives from the Old English Ealhraedwīc or Alfredwīc, meaning 'Ealhraed/Alfred's trading settlement'.

Alfrick was in the upper division of Doddingtree Hundred.

Following the Poor Law Amendment Act 1834 Alfrick Parish ceased to be responsible for maintaining the poor in its parish. This responsibility was transferred to Martley Poor Law Union.

The village had a pub, the Swan, in its centre until about 2000.

The village church is dedicated to Saint Mary Magdalene It has original sandstone window casings, Dutch stained glass and exposed internal roof beams. On the exterior of its tower is a sundial
