= All Saints, Devon =

Civil parish in East Devon, Devon, England

Coordinates: 50°48′29″N 2°59′10″W

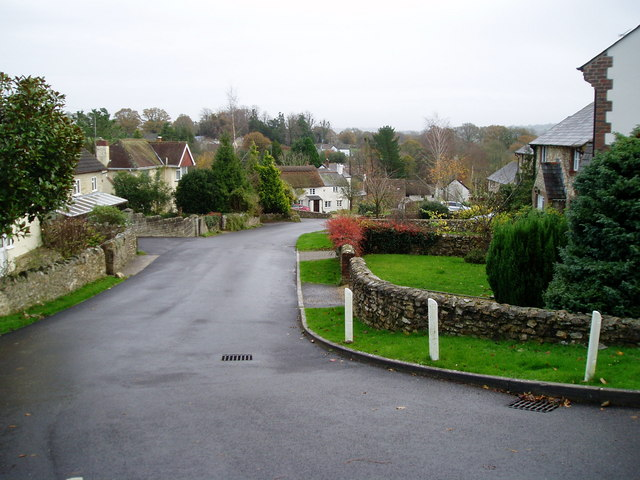
Smallridge

All Saints is a civil parish in East Devon, Devon, England. It has a population of 498 according to the 2001 census. The parish includes the hamlets of All Saints, Smallridge, Churchill, Alston and Waggs Plot. This area also has one cricket pitch, a primary school, pre-school and a church.

The parish was created in 1990 from part of the neighbouring parish of Chardstock.
