= Alswear =

Village in Devon, England

Coordinates: 50.98°N 03.82°W

- Location within Devon
- OS grid reference: SS7222
- Shire county: Devon
- Region: South West
- Country: England
- Sovereign state: United Kingdom
- Police: Devon and Cornwall
- Fire: Devon and Somerset
- Ambulance: South Western

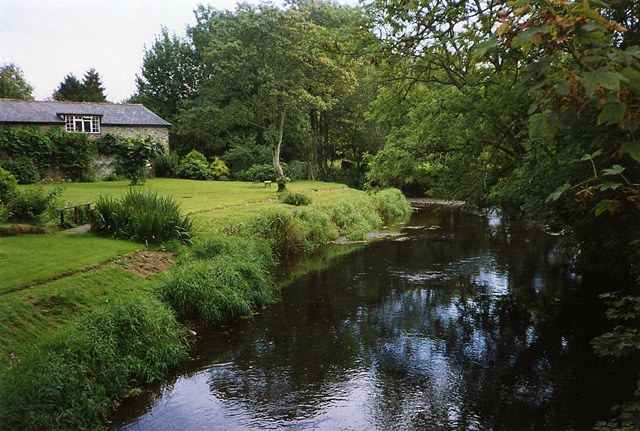
Mariansleigh, River Mole at Alswear

Alswear is a village in Devon, England, approximately 25 miles (40 km) northwest of Exeter.
