= River Yealm =

River in Devon, England

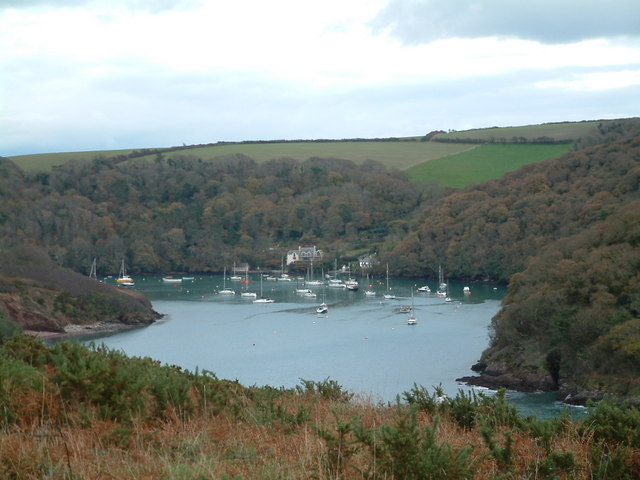

Location
- Country: England
- County: Devon

Physical characteristics
- Mouth
  - coordinates: 50°18′38.8″N 4°4′13.5″W
- Length: 12 mi (19 km)

The Yealm is a river in Devon in England that rises 430 m (1,410 ft) above sea level on the Stall Moor mires of south Dartmoor and travels 12 miles (19 km) to the sea, passing through Cornwood, Lee Mill and Yealmpton, a mid-sized village with a population of c.2,000 which is its largest settlement, before reaching its estuary which forms a ria bounded on its western side by Wembury. A deep inlet of this ria forms the waterfront to Newton Ferrers and Noss Mayo on its eastern side.

== Harbour ==
The harbour authority is made up of representatives from the civil parish councils of Wembury, Yealmpton, Brixton and "Newton and Noss".

== Neighbouring catchment areas ==
It is the river and estuary between the River Plym which discharges at Plymouth and the River Erme which discharges by Meadowsfoot Beach, Mothecombe in Holbeton parish.

== History ==
This short river once supported relatively large stocks of salmon, sea trout and brown trout but their populations have dwindled since the 1940s.

== Aquatic life ==
The River Yealm may have lost some of this stock of the most-eaten fish in the United Kingdom, but it has managed to retain other important species: it remains a key conservation area. The river acts as a bass hatchery. The Yealm is a Special Area of Conservation (SAC), and a Site of Special Scientific Interest (SSSI) chiefly for supporting many protected species.

Cockles and wild oysters can be found on the shore at low tide in the right season.

The Yealm estuary has a large suitable oyster bed, a portion of which has long been in active use. The fertility of the foodstuff for oysters in estuaries relates to the environment given to this foodstuff, phytoplankton, which can double its numbers/mass every 24 hours with ideal freshwater and marine nutrients, but nude microscopic algae in some locations multiply so quickly they can exhaust all the available plant nutrients and they return to dormancy. Here, the River Yealm and its estuary incoming flows keep a well-matched balance, such that the freshwater and seawater mix is in approximately ideal proportions. Also the necessary phytoplankton are not all washed out to sea here at neap tides. Not all South Devon estuaries share these features: e.g. the large Kingsbridge Estuary beside Salcombe, receives too little fresh-water while others, like the Dart receive too much for ideal shellfish production rates.

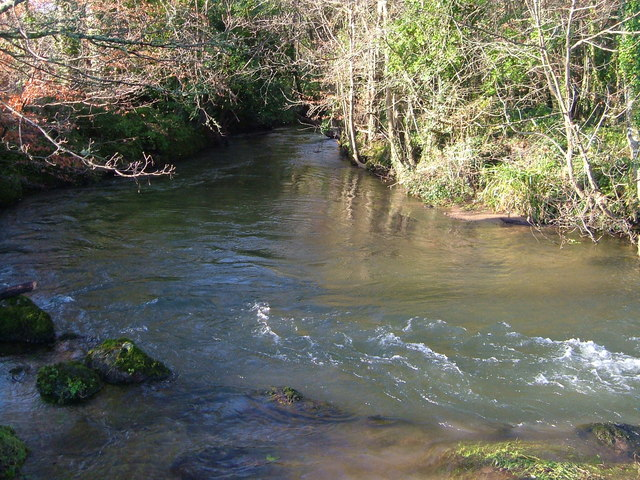
River Yealm near Yealmpton.

== Meteo-tsunami ==
The Yealm estuary is one of the few places in the world subject to meteo-tsunamis. This phenomenon, known locally as a sitch (also seiche) sees a sudden unrush of water similar to a small tsunami but caused by meteorological conditions. This type of event has been studied little until recently but is largely restricted to a few places in the UK and eastern mediterranean. These surges can happen repeatedly over the course of a few hours.
