= Alcester, Dorset =

Village in Dorset, England

Coordinates: 50.99°N 02.21°W

Alcester
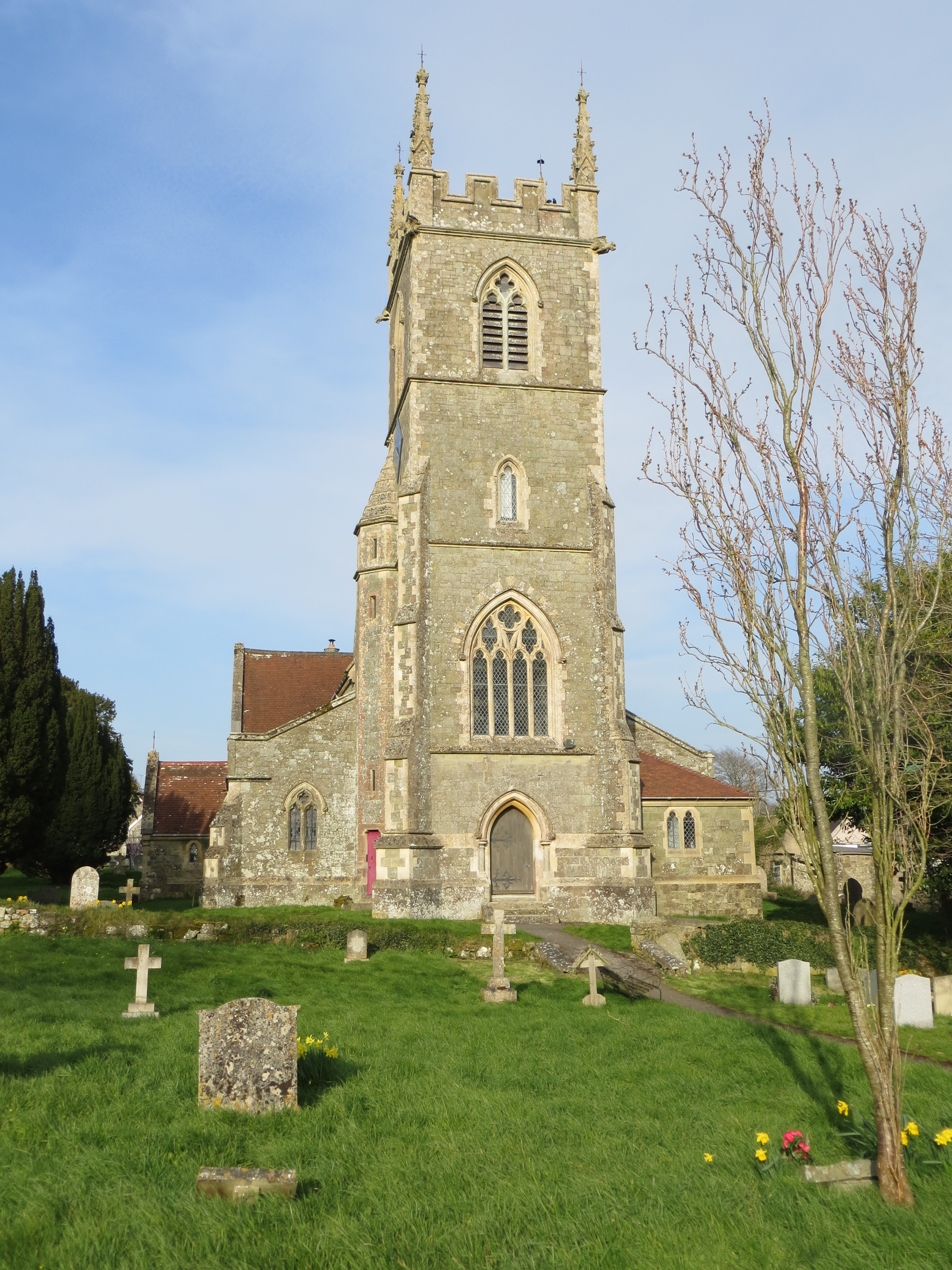
- The Church of St James at Alcester

- Location within Dorset
- OS grid reference: ST8522
- Civil parish: Shaftesbury
- Unitary authority: Dorset
- Ceremonial county: Dorset
- Region: South West
- Country: England
- Sovereign state: United Kingdom
- Police: Dorset
- Fire: Dorset and Wiltshire
- Ambulance: South Western

Alcester is a village in the civil parish of Shaftesbury, in Dorset, England.

== History ==
Alcester was formerly a liberty in the parish of St. James Shaftesbury, within the parliamentary borough of Shaftesbury, but without the municipal borough, Dorset. Pop., 342. Houses, 76. On 31 December 1894 Alcester became a separate civil parish, on 9 November 1921 the parish was abolished and merged with Shaftesbury. In 1921 the parish had a population of 291.
