= Alminstone Cross =

Village in Devon, England

Coordinates: 50.95°N 04.36°W

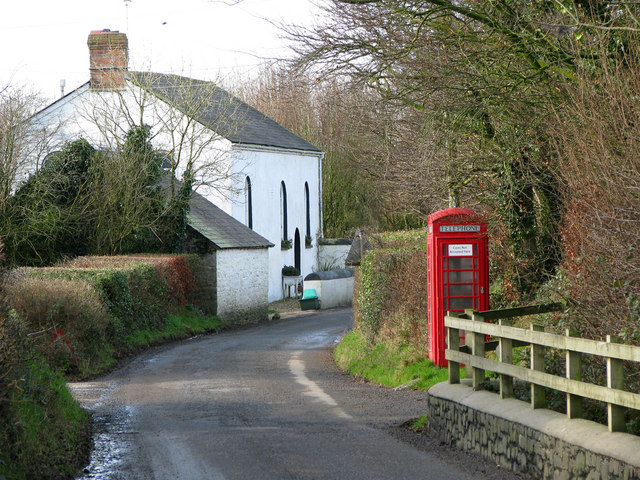
- Phonebox at Alminstone Cross

- Location within Devon
- OS grid reference: SS3420
- Shire county: Devon
- Region: South West
- Country: England
- Sovereign state: United Kingdom
- Police: Devon and Cornwall
- Fire: Devon and Somerset
- Ambulance: South Western

Alminstone Cross is a village in Devon, England.
