= Aller Park, Devon =

Village in Devon, England

Coordinates: 50.5090°N 3.5853°W

Aller Park (also known as Aller) was a village in Devon, England, southeast of the town of Newton Abbot. The name is shared with the Aller Brook, which joins the River Teign at Newton Abbot.

Today it is a suburb of the town, within Newton Abbot civil parish.

There is also a suburban area named Aller a short distance to the south, in Kingskerswell parish.
