= Aller, Devon =

Village in Devon, England

Coordinates: 50.852°N 3.348°W

Aller
- Location within Devon
- OS grid reference: ST0506
- Civil parish: Kentisbeare
- District: Mid Devon
- Shire county: Devon
- Region: South West
- Country: England
- Sovereign state: United Kingdom
- Police: Devon and Cornwall
- Fire: Devon and Somerset
- Ambulance: South Western

Aller is a village in the civil parish of Kentisbeare in the historic county of Devon, England. Aller is situated about 2 miles (3.2 km) east of Cullompton.

Historically, it has been known by other names, such as Aulers during the 15th century. Alre, Alra, Avra, and Avvra have all been used since the 10th century.
