= Murray Theater =

Murray Theater may refer to:

- Murray Theater (Richmond, Indiana), listed on the NRHP in Indiana
- Murray Theater (Murray, Utah), listed on the NRHP in Utah
