= Gorman Brothers =

American songwriters and performers

The Gorman Brothers
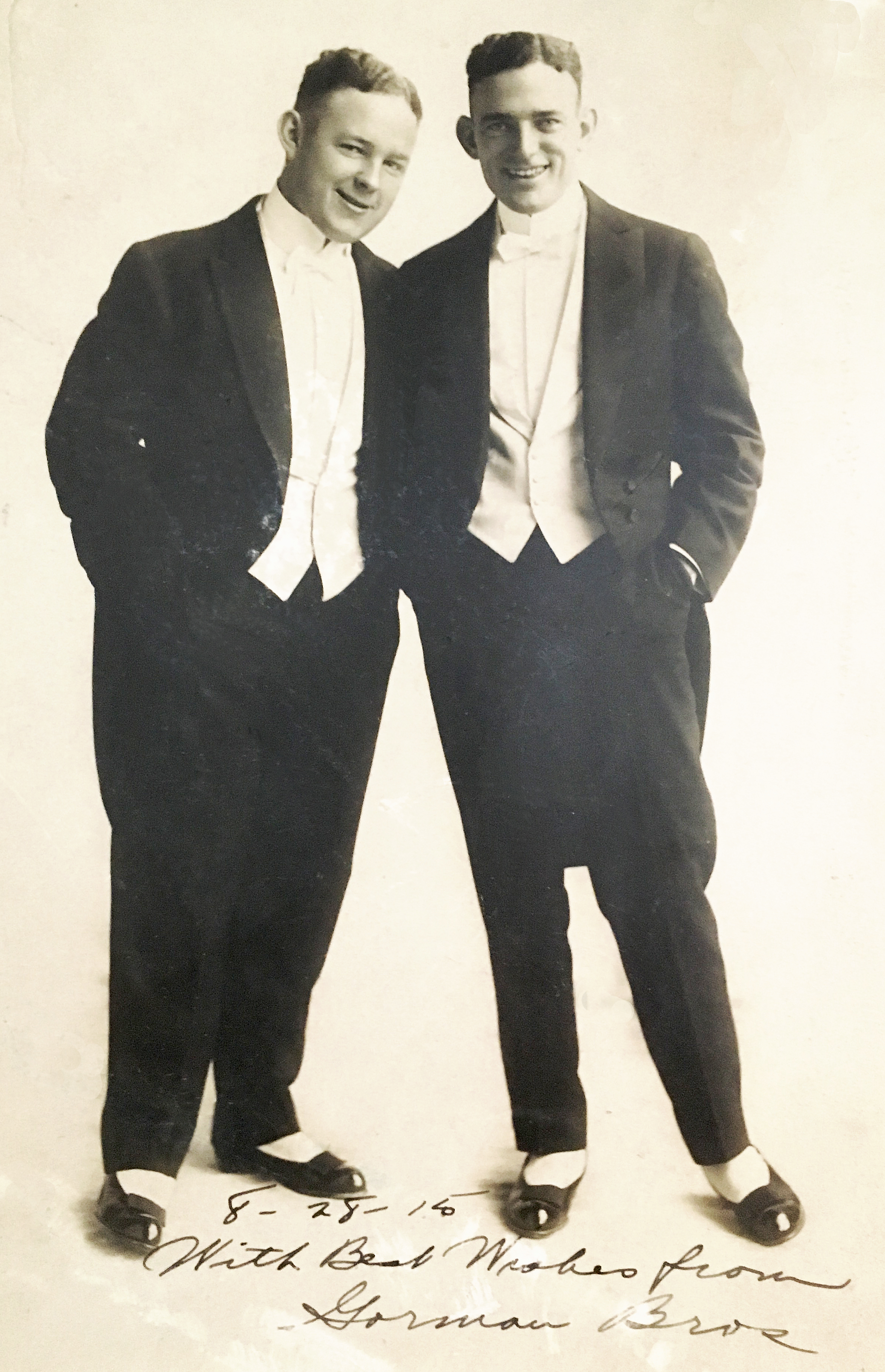
- Eddie and Billy Gorman, 1915

Background information
- Origin: Chicago, Illinois, US
- Genre: Vaudeville
- Occupations: Entertainers, Songwriters
- Years active: 1913–1932
- Past members: Edward Aloysius Gorman; William Charles Gorman

The Gorman Brothers, Billy and Eddie Gorman, were a pair of vaudevillian entertainers and songwriters from Chicago, who performed across the United States and Canada from the early 1910s to the early 1930s. The Gormans expanded their act to radio, doing weekly broadcasts in the late 1920s. The brothers used local news stories to create songs for their act. During their show-business career, Billy and Eddie Gorman also contributed music and lyrics to several published and recorded songs.

== Early life ==
William Charles "Billy" Gorman was born on 31 March 1889. His younger brother Edward Aloysius "Eddie" Gorman was born 27 June 1892. They were the sons of William E. Gorman, an Irish immigrant who worked as a stationary engineer, and Mary E. (O'Halloran) Gorman, a piano salesperson, originally from Canada.

While still in the early stages of his entertainment career, Billy played ball for the Decatur Three-I League baseball team, the Commodores. He was the team's manager and shortstop. By the first half of 1913, his performance on the field had notably suffered, and after being replaced as the manager, he was sold to the Terre Haute club of the Central League in July of that year. During his time there, he was praised as being "a fast and aggressive player". He finished one season with this club, and was traded to the Victoria BC club of the Northwest League. However, he refused to report to this club and was subsequently released from it. By November 1914, he had given up the sport entirely to work in show business with his younger brother, Eddie, and their accompaniment pianist, J. Walter Leopold.

Eddie had worked as a railroad clerk, and later as an "on the street" newspaper reporter for the Chicago Tribune, during his brother's baseball career.

While the act started out on the road as The Gorman Brothers and Leopold, Leopold's name disappeared from the billings after January 1915, and from then on, the team was featured only as The Gorman Brothers.

== Vaudeville ==
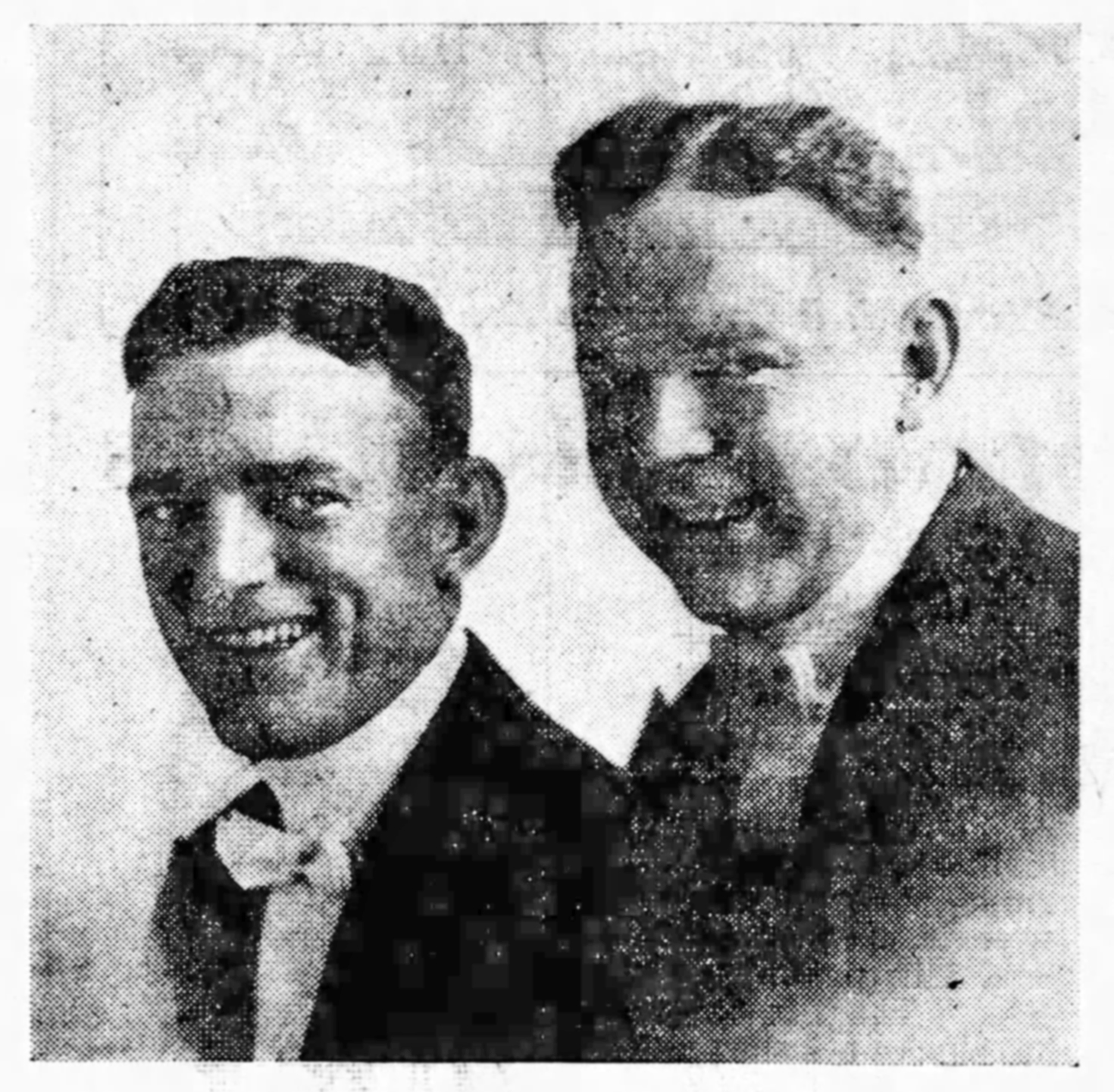
Billy and Eddie Gorman 1916

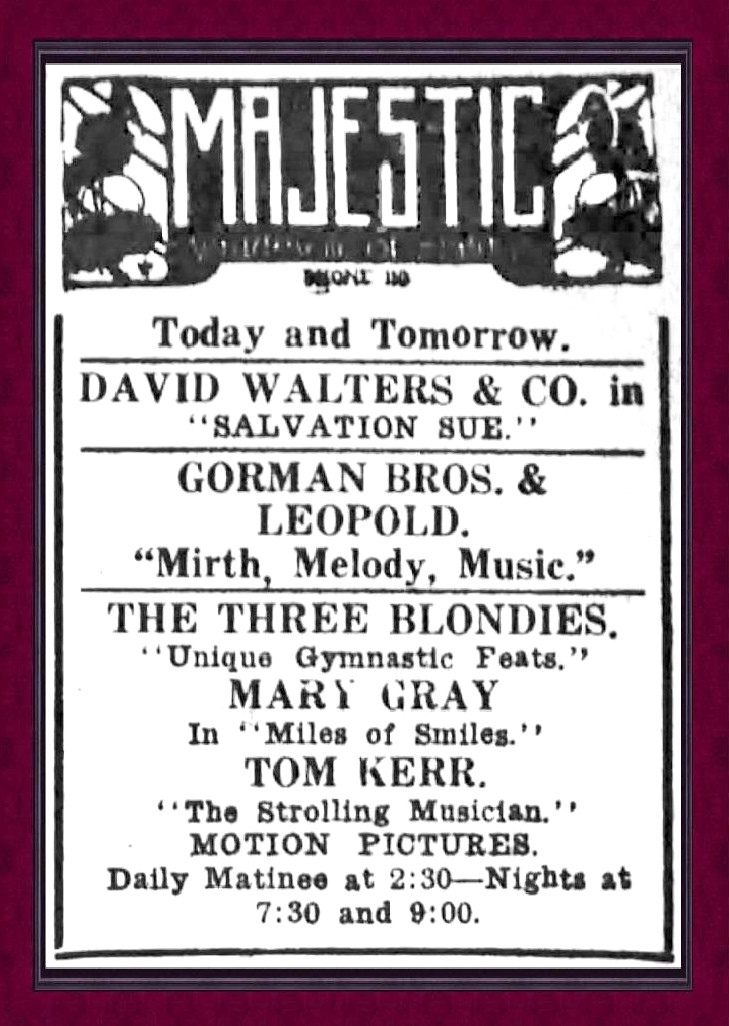
Majestic Theater ad, The Arkansas Democrat, 1914

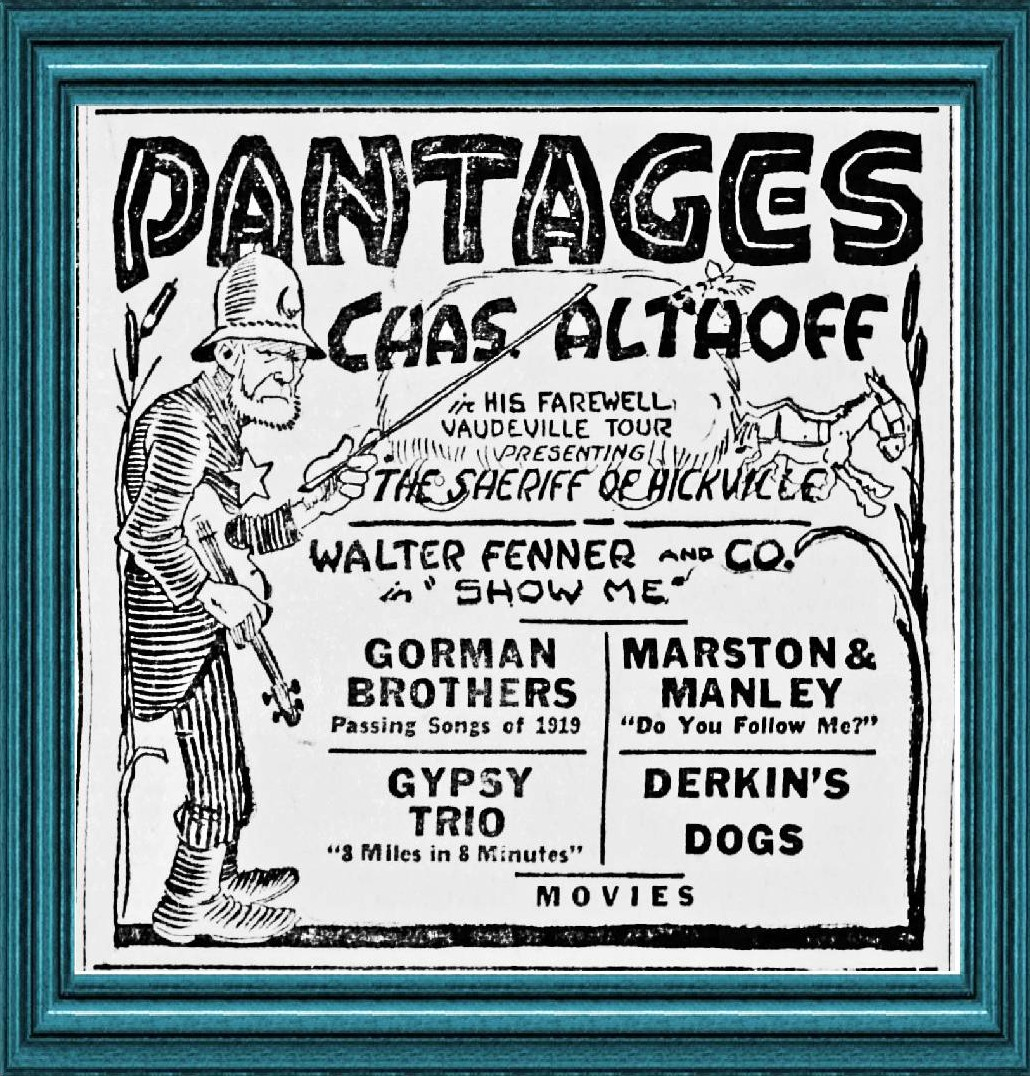
Pantages Theater ad, Star Tribune, 1920

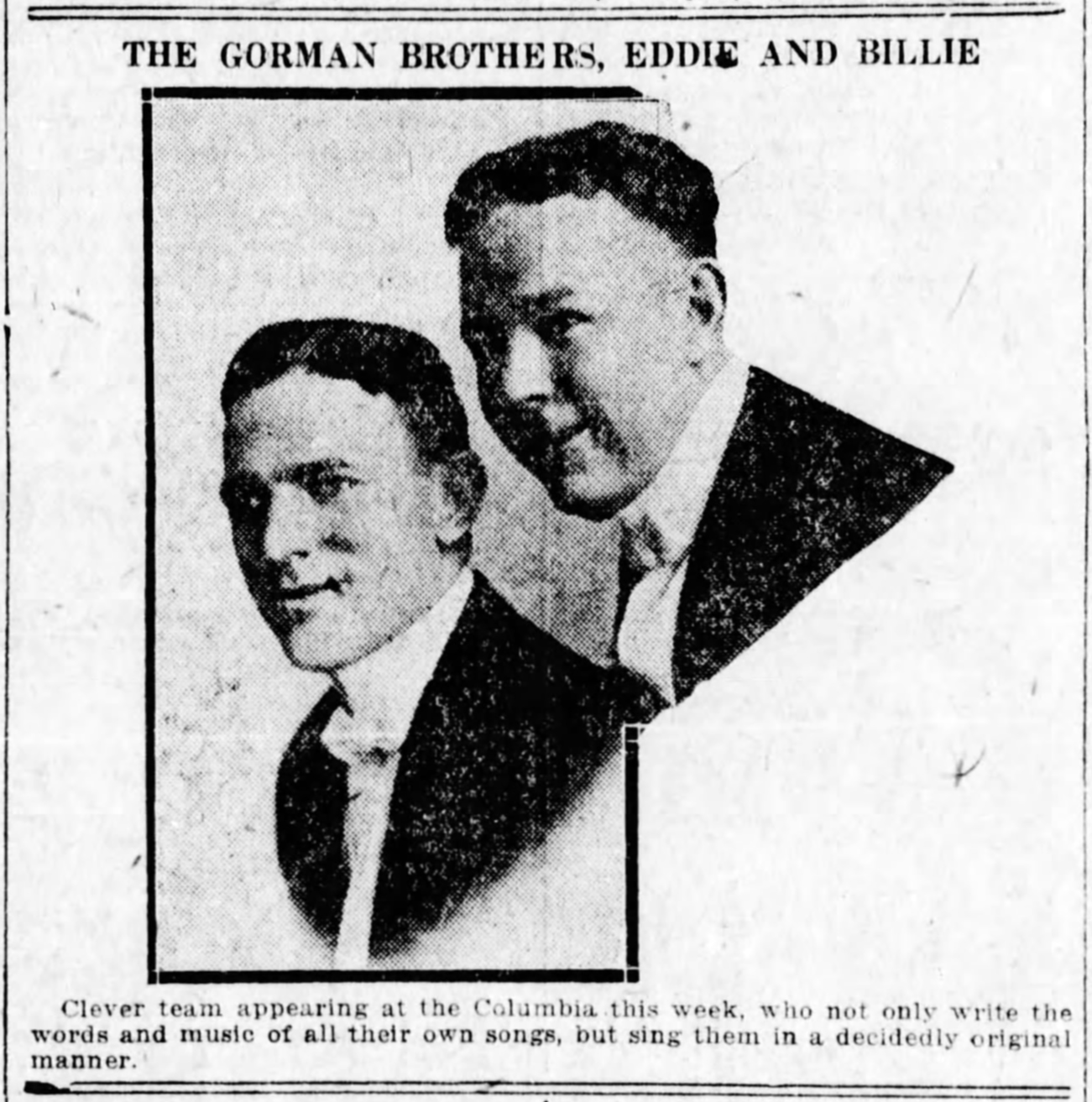
Gorman Brothers, The Vancouver Daily World, 1916

The Gorman Brothers wrote all-original songs for their acts, often drawing from news events of the day that were relevant to the locations they played. A feature article on their work described how they would get up in the morning, go to the editorial room of the local newspaper, and, "As the news copy comes from the telegraph operators, the vaudevillians cast their respective eagle eyes over it and select five or six items for jingling purposes." Another source explained,"...the men subscribe to the local newspaper for about three weeks before they arrive at the town where they are scheduled to play. In this manner, they are able to word the news stories to fit their music."

Credited with such names as "the boys with a thousand songs", "the singing reporters", and "the kings of character singing", they entertained in many cities across the U.S. and Canada. They were rarely the headliners, but the entertainment sections of the newspapers frequently reviewed their performances. Below are a few examples:

Date Publicized	Newspaper	Location	Venue	Performance Notes
7 Mar 1913	Suburbanite Economist	Chicago, IL	Yale Theater	"...the greatest of all harmony and character singers."
19 Nov 1914	The Daily Times	Davenport, IA	Columbia Theater	"...these boys know how to put them [their songs] over 'with a kick in them'."
20 Nov 1914	Quad City Times	Davenport, IA	Majestic Theater	"The act of Gorman Brothers and Leopold is one of the hits of the current Majestic bill."
19 Jan 1915	The Bridgeport Times and Evening Farmer	Bridgeport, CT	Plaza Theater	"...the audience responded so heartily that they came back for two encores."
9 Apr 1916	The Butte Miner	Butte, MT	Empress Theatre	"...not only sing entertainingly, but sing their own song compositions..."
5 May 1918	The Atlanta Constitution	Atlanta, GA	Loew's Grand Theatre	"...comedians with exceptional voices in original repertoire..."
21 Dec 1918	The Charlotte Observer	Charlotte, NC	Academy Theatre	"...swift and sure-fire humorous strokes and rapid-fire repartee. They have been much applauded during the week,..."
8 Apr 1919	The Brooklyn Daily Eagle	Brooklyn, NY	Flatbush Theater	"The Gorman brothers offer a somewhat different act and won instant favor last night."
30 Sep 1919	New_Castle_Herald	New Castle, PA	Coliseum Theater	"Their singing and their presentation is irresistable"
28 Feb 1920	The Anaconda Standard	Anaconda, MT	Pantages	"The capacity audience last night were reluctant in letting the boys go and their song, 'Beautiful Eggs', received round upon round of applause."
23 Mar 1920	The Vancouver Sun	Vancouver, BC	Pantages	"The Gorman brothers offer a likeable repertoire of popular song hits, and they sing them in a manner which gets home instantly."
4 Oct 1921	The Akron Beacon Journal	Akron, OH	Colonial Theater	"Judging solely by applause the freshly minted ten dollar gold piece goes to the Brothers Gorman."
5 Sep 1922	The Richmond Palladium and Sun Telegram	Richmond, IN	Murray Theater	"The boys are clever...it is with real enthusiasm that the audience recalls the brothers for further entertainment."
14 Apr 1924	The Scranton Times	Scranton, PA	Poli Theatre	"The Gorman brothers have voices above the average...It ['Topics of the Day'] is a classy musical offering and one of the finest in vaudeville."
19 Jan 1926	The Akron Beacon Journal	Akron, OH	Colonial Theatre	"Their clever comedy songs are stopping the show at the Colonial in the first half of this week."
8 Apr 1927	Lansing State Journal	Lansing, MI	Strand Theatre	"They have good voices and their act is a high spot on the card for the last half."
1 Feb 1928	The Windsor Star	Windsor, Ontario	Capitol Theatre	" These 'singing reporters' set local topics to music and give the current vaudeville bill a decidedly novel twist."
9 Jan 1932	Green Bay Press Gazette	Green Bay, WI	Orpheum Theatre	"Two fur-coated gentlemen, the Gorman brothers, are on in the third spot on the bill....Reading from the Press-Gazette, the boys picked out several headlines and advertisements and proceeded to set the words to music."

Early in 1932, the Gorman Brothers' names stopped appearing in the newspapers. Vaudeville had met its end as an art form by then, with the introduction of talking movies, and the impact on the economy from the Great Depression. The brothers did not appear to have made a transition to the silver screen. and there is no known footage of them performing their acts.

== Radio ==
In the late 1920s, the Gormans had taken their act to the airwaves, reaching a larger audience as "the singing reporters", in a weekly broadcast for the National Broadcasting Company. Their broadcasts reached fans in Springfield, Baltimore, Rochester, Pittsburgh, and Cincinnati.

== Songwriting ==
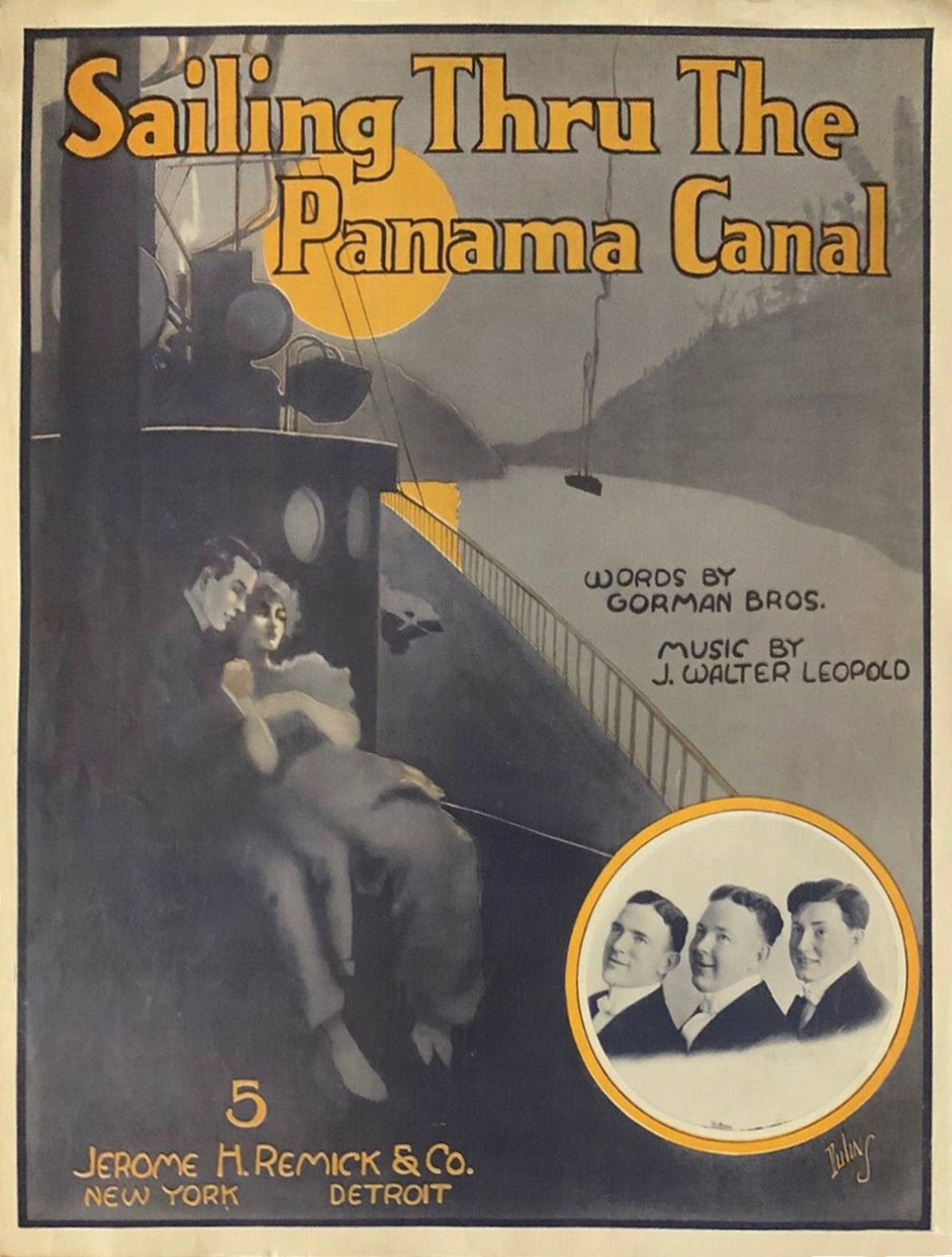
Sailing Thru the Panama Canal sheet music 1914

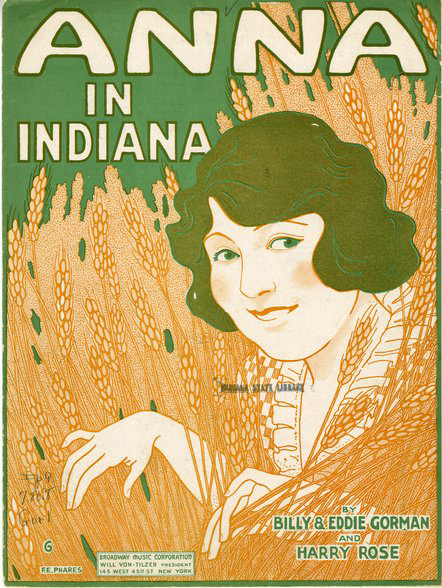
Anna in Indiana sheet music cover

In addition to creating all-new songs for their act, the brothers are credited with a number of published and recorded musical works.

These include:

- "Why Don't They Dance the Good Old Dances of Ireland ?" (1912)- lyrics in the sheet music are credited to Eddie Gorman, yet a newspaper article attributes the song to his brother Billy
- "Sailing Thru The Panama Canal" (1914) - music by J. Walter Leopold
- "Anna in Indiana" (1921) - written with Harry Rose and F.E. Phares; recorded on Edison Blue Amberol cylinder in 1921 with vocalist Aileen Stanley
- "All By Myself" (1921) - written with Aileen Stanley, Harry Rose, Arthur Fields; recorded on 78 rpm disc in 1921 with Aileen Stanley, comedienne, and Irving Berlin's orchestra [side a] and Arthur Fields, tenor, with Irving Berlin's orchestra [side b]
- "Mammy's Little Angel Chile" (1921) - written with Harry Rose
- "Mareeta" (ca. 1921)
- "When She Walks" (ca. 1921)
- "Ain't We Got Ambition" (ca.1922)
- "Atta Boy, Petey, Old Boy" (ca.1922)
- "Revenge is Sweet" (ca.1922)
- "That Was Before I Was Married" (ca.1922)
- "I've Had Fifty-Seven Varieties (of Sweethearts)" (1922) - recorded on Edison disc in Nov 1922, featuring vocalist Billy Jones. The Gorman Brothers had recorded themselves on a novelty version of this song, as a quartet, with Billy singing second tenor and Eddie singing first tenor, baritone, and bass (by making multiple-pass recordings as Eddie sang a new part to the old recording with each new pass). Billy carried around the one and only recording of this disc.
- "When Greek Meets Greek" (1923) - written with Edward Furman, W. Nash, Harry Von Tilzer; recorded on 78rpm disc on 19 Oct 1923 with vocalists Furman and Nash
- Eddie Cantor's Song and Joke Book. No. 1 (1930) - written with Eddie Cantor; includes parodies to "Singin' in the Rain", "Tip Toe Thru the Tulips", and "Sunny Side Up", with songs titled "Oh Yeah!", "I Found a 'Thru' street to Happiness", "Don't Go to the Poor-House Mother", and "When I Waltz With You"
- "Waltzing" (1930)

== Later life ==
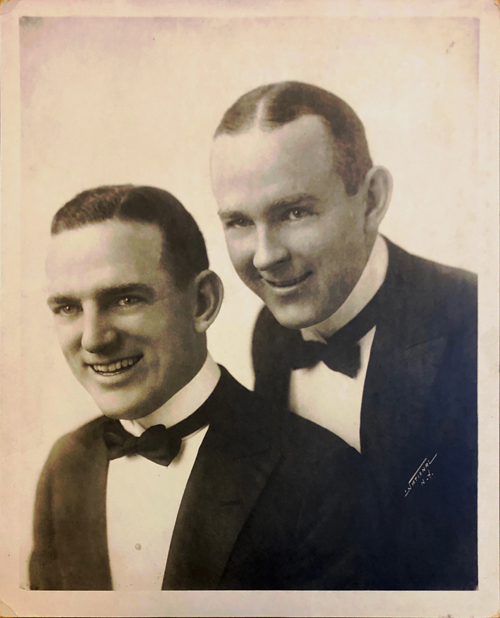
The Gorman Brothers - Billy and Eddie

Eddie and Billy (together with Billy's wife Josephine and their children Elaine, Dolores, and William) lived with their mother, Mary, in Chicago up through the 1940s. Mary died on 17 July 1945 (her husband William had died many years earlier, on 25 Oct 1914). According to the occupation section in the 1940 census, the brothers had continued their show-business careers as night club entertainers.

Billy, a long-time golf professional, became the owner of Gorman's Golf Practice Range (established Aug 1938) in Cicero, IL, and simultaneously held a position as a golf pro at Golfmoor Golf club in nearby Oaklawn, IL. In 1939, he appeared in a newspaper ad for Meister Brau beer, where he was shown giving golf lessons to onlookers. His 1942 draft registration card still listed his place of employment as Golfmoor.

Eddie, who had not married, died on 17 May 1957 at the age of 64. Billy died a few years later on 8 Nov 1961 at age 72.
