= Vic Theatre =

Historic theater venue

The Vic Theatre is a historic theater venue located at 217-221 E Walnut St in Green Bay, Wisconsin. It is included as part of the Green Bay Downtown Historic District in the National Register of Historic Places listings in Brown County, Wisconsin. The theater was designed and built by Chicago theater developer George Johnston and Kewaunee businessman John Fischer.

The Vic Theatre opened as the Green Bay Theatre (GBT) in 1900. It was inaugurated with a performance of William Gillette's play Because She Loved Him So on February 24 1900. It was performed by Charles Frohman's stock theatre company with a cast led by Thomas David, Clara Dickey, Effie Germon, and John D. Murphy. An urban legend later circulated about this premiere performance claiming that the two lead actors in this play were having an extramarital affair and were caught kissing after the show by the lead actress's husband. The myth asserts that that husband shot the actors dead before committing suicide. This urban legend was the basis for independent film Room 108: The Clearing (2023).

The Vic Theatre and was renamed the Orpheum Theatre in 1912 when it became part of the Orpheum Circuit of vaudeville theaters. Some of the vaudeville entertainers who performed at the theater included the Gorman Brothers and Arren and Broderick. The Orpheum Theatre ultimately became a cinema and was notably the theater selected to present the world premiere screening of The Wizard of Oz on August 10, 1939. However, the honor of the first screening of the film was stolen when the Zietz Brothers, without authorization, pushed back their planned opening of the film to August 9, 1939 at the State Theatre in New Bedford, Massachusetts. They did that to coincide with Judy Garland and Mickey Rooney's visit to Massachusetts during their promotion of the movie prior to its national release.

It operated as the Vic Theatre from 1958 until 1986 when it was renamed the City Centre Theatre. In 1995 the theatre underwent significant changes when it was transformed into a dance club. It operated as a series of changing nightclubs, most recently Confetti’s until it was purchased by Steve Schneider. In 2022 Schneider announced plans to renovate the venue and re-open it as a downtown entertainment and event space.
