= J. Walter Leopold =

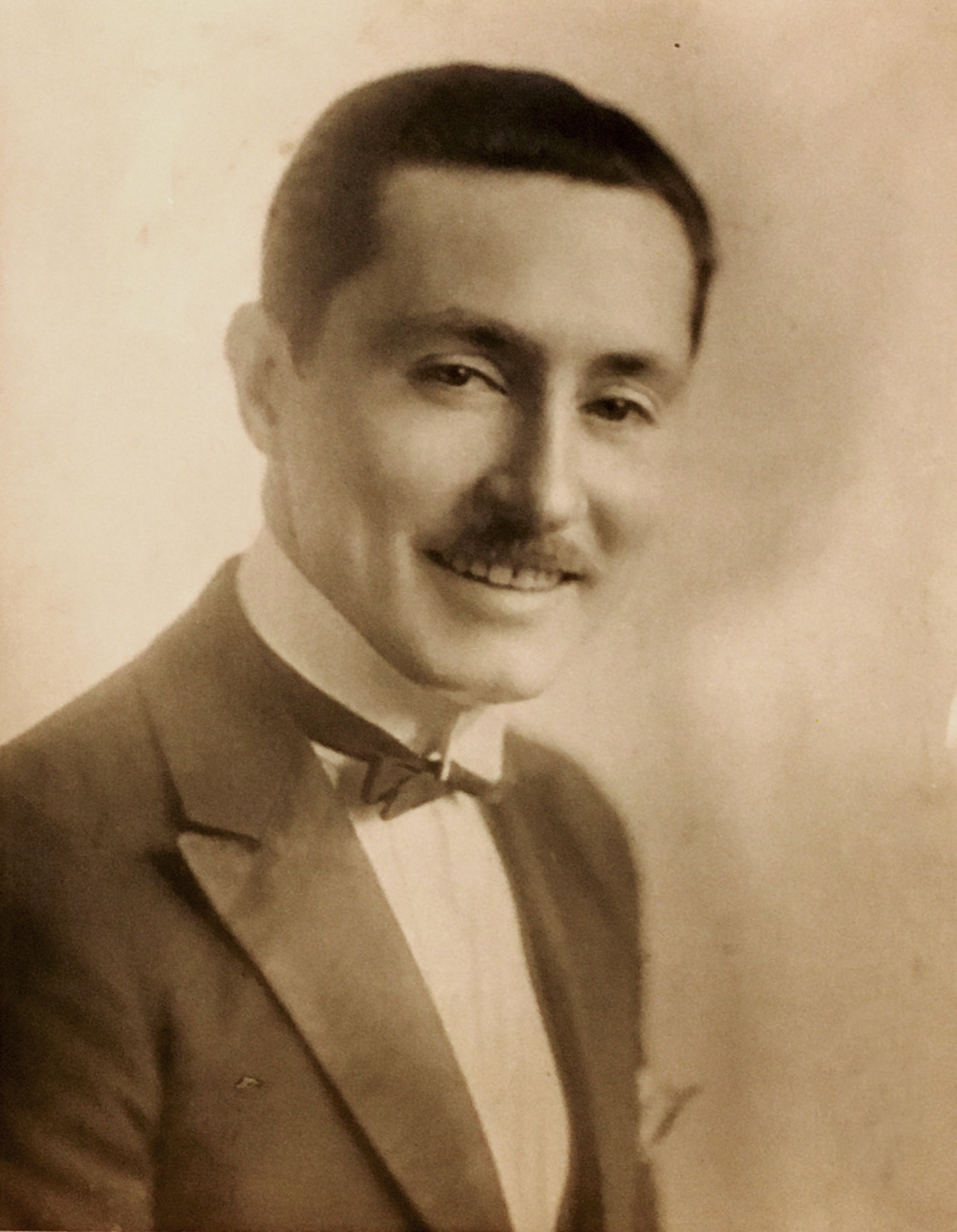

Background information
- Born: Joseph Walter Leopold; 27 July 1890; Brooklyn, New York
- Died: 28 December 1956 (aged 66)
- Genres: Vaudeville, popular
- Occupations: Pianist, entertainer, songwriter, comedian, singer
- Instrument: Piano

J. Walter Leopold (born Joseph Walter Leopold) was an American pianist, songwriter, singer, and comedian from Brooklyn, who entertained audiences in the United States and Canada from the 1910s through the early 1930s. He started his career in vaudeville, and later moved to radio-broadcast performances. In addition to creating new songs for the entertainers he accompanied, Leopold contributed music and lyrics to several published and recorded songs.

== Vaudeville ==
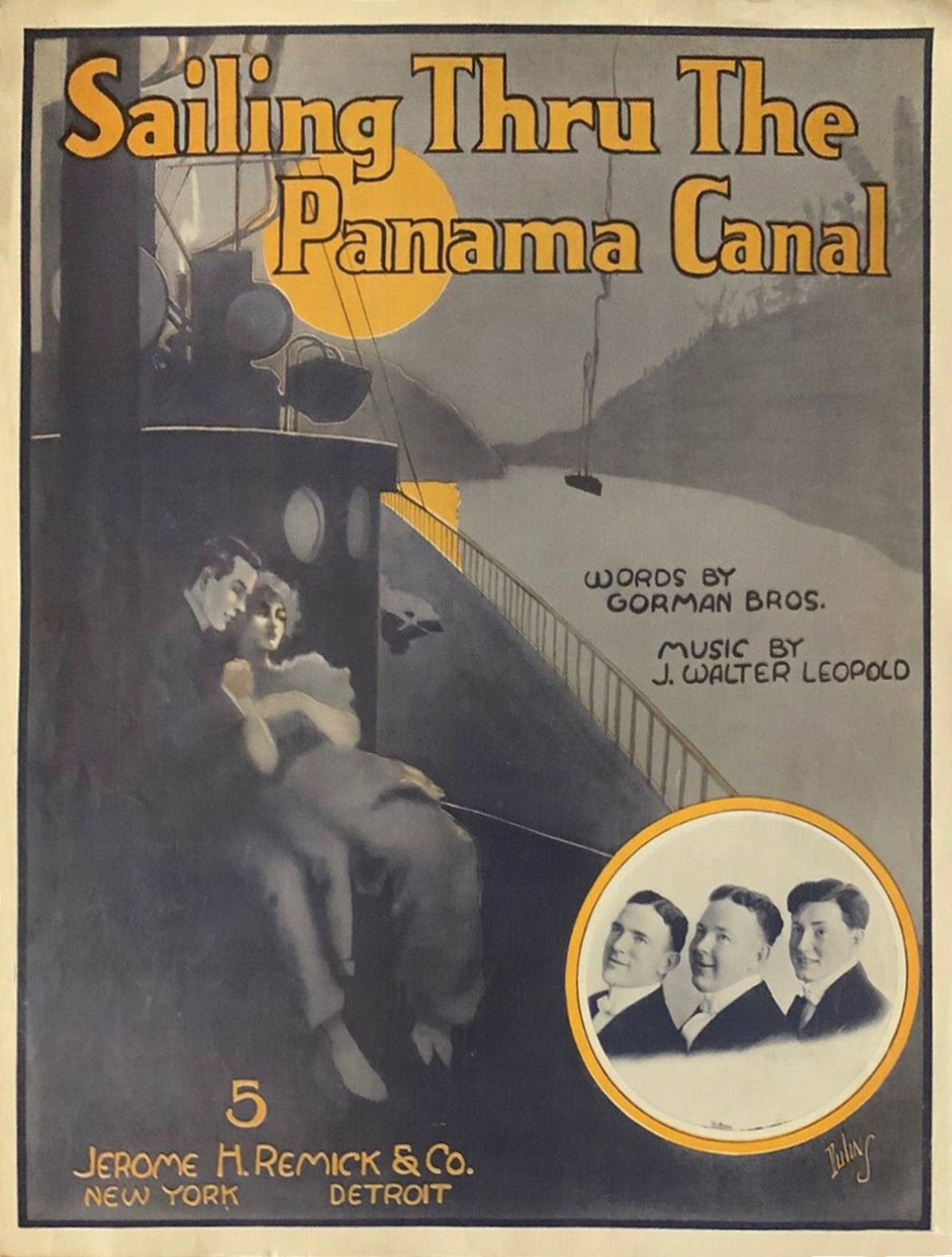
Sailing Thru the Panama Canal featuring the Gorman Brothers

J. Walter Leopold began his vaudeville career in 1914 as the pianist in The Gorman Brothers and Leopold. He provided the music for the team, but was not just the piano player in the background; he also sang and did comedy. An early review reported that J. Walter and the Gormans, "All have good voices...," and, "... the kind of comedy they put into their act is out of the beaten track." Another critic commented, "The comedian of the trio is J Walter Leopold, and he gives the act a lot of life, and inserts much good humor." Sometime in early 1915, he left the Gormans and disappeared from the theater ads for a few years.

Leopold resurfaced in November 1917, when he and partner Bert Lewis entertained as "The Merry Men From Songland." A 1918 review of their act, at The Palace in New Orleans, credits Leopold with being, "the clean performer" outshining his partner Bert Lewis, whose performance "cheapens their act."

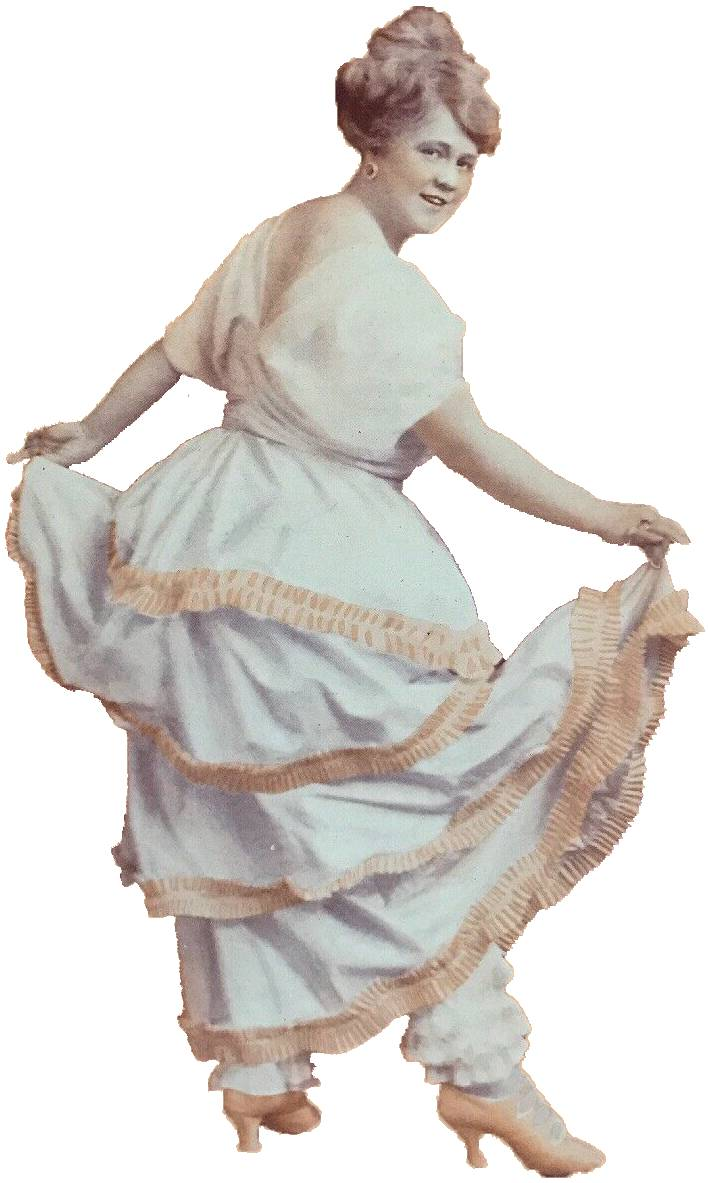

Shortly thereafter, in 1918, he teamed up with Emma Carus, "a star in the Ziegfeld Follies and numerous musical comedy hits, [and] a headliner on the Orpheum circuit." Leopold entertained with Carus from late 1918 to early 1925 in the Orpheum theaters, where their act was typically billed as "Emma Carus, with J. Walter Leopold, Singing Their Own Songs." In addition to accompanying Carus during her songs, he would play the piano and sing while she was offstage doing costume changes, and would sometimes get up and dance with her. Because Carus had a somewhat plump figure, critics would sometimes jokingly comment in their articles about how much of a workout Leopold received by lifting her in the dancing routines.

In January 1928, Leopold appeared in the Tulare Theater (Tulare, CA) with the Kansas City Night Hawks, "America's youngest professional jazz orchestra."

In April 1928, he appeared solo at the Madison Theater in Brooklyn.

Leopold continued his association with the Kansas City Night Hawks as their manager. In 1929, he and the band, coming from "a swing through the first class vaudeville houses on the West coast" played nightly in Trenton, NJ, at the Everglades Farms, a restaurant with entertaining and dancing. Later that year, Leopold started working at Everglades Farms regularly, without the Night Hawks, as a Master of Ceremonies.

== Radio ==
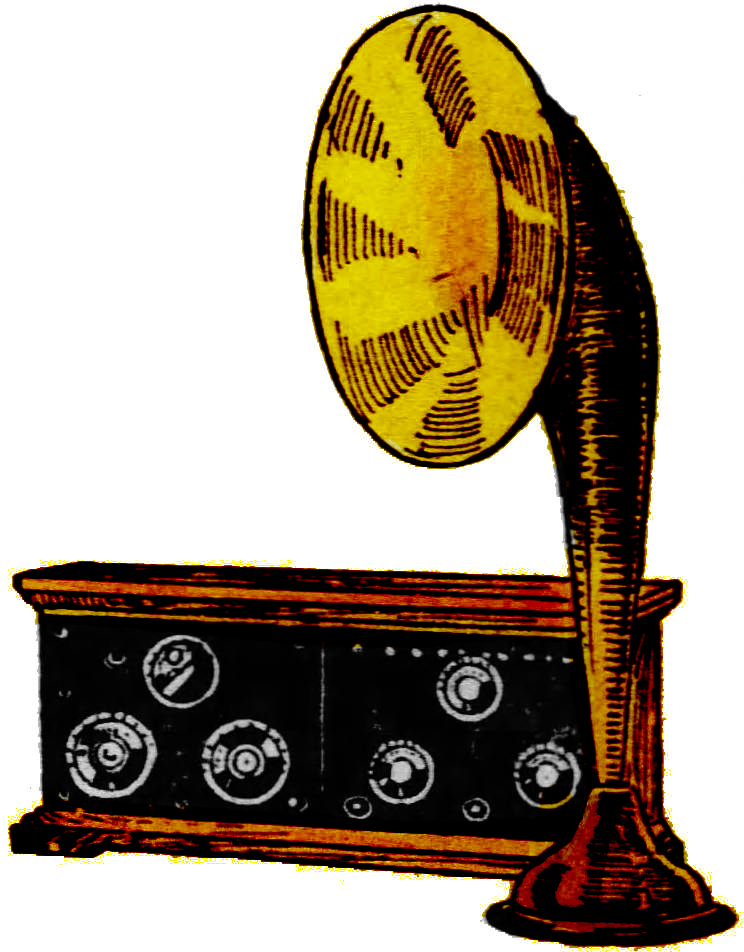

From September 1926 to late 1930, Leopold worked for radio station KHJ in Los Angeles, where he was known as "The Cliffdweller." Here, he would perform fifteen to thirty-minute programs, playing piano and singing. His shows included both popular tunes and his own compositions. In November 1930, his show was being broadcast in New York on Station WOV.

== Songwriting ==
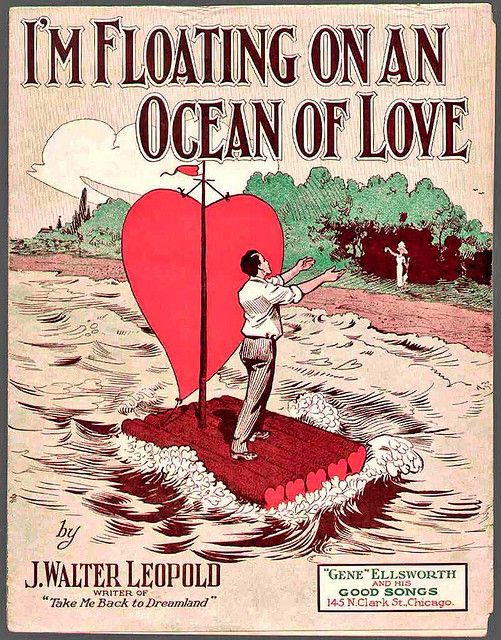
I'm Floating On an Ocean of Love sheet music, 1912

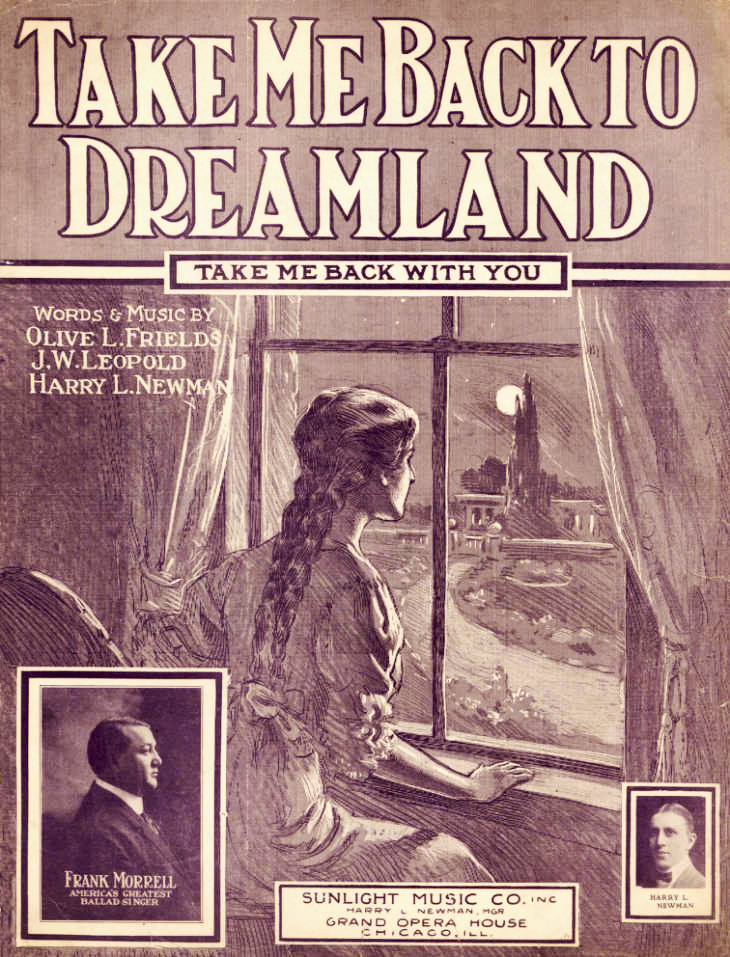
Take Me Back to Dreamland sheet music, 1912

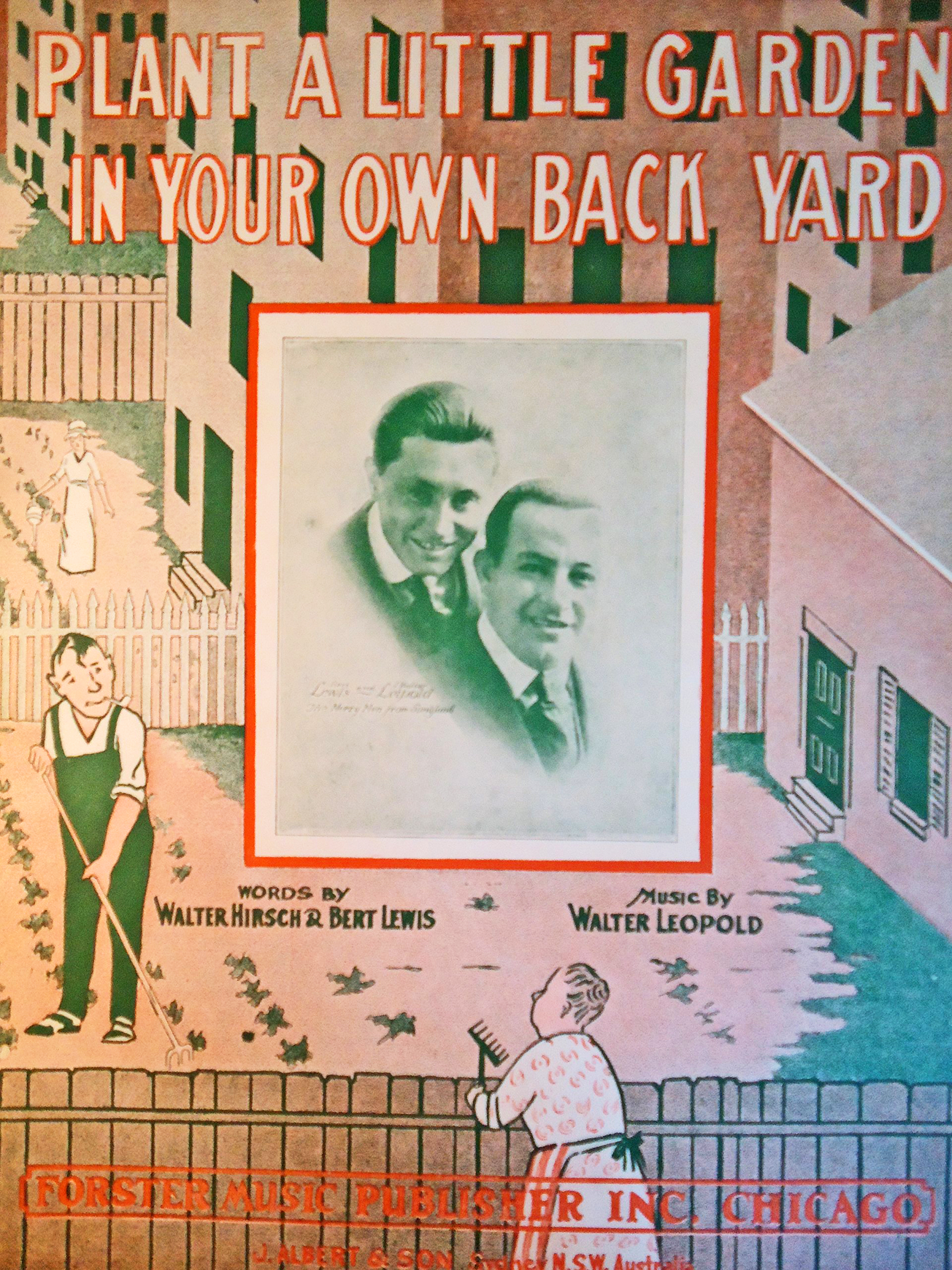
Plant a Little Garden sheet music, 1917, feat. Leopold and Bert Lewis

J. Walter Leopold composed the music for the following:

Songs

- "Play That Lovin' Slide Trombone" (1911) – lyrics by Arthur Gillespie
- "I'm Floating on an Ocean of Love" (1912)
- "In Dear Old Dixieland" (1912) – written with Harry L. Newman, lyrics by Olive L. Frields
- "Little By Little" (1912)
- "Take Me Back to Dreamland: Take Me Back With You" (1912) – written with Olive L. Frields and Harry L. Newman
- "The Ragtime Drummer Man" (1912)
- "The Razzle Dazzle Glide" (1912)
- "What a Wonderful World" (1913) – written with Jack Brennan
- "Down in Chinatown" (1914) – lyrics by J. Casper Nathan
- "Sailing Thru The Panama Canal" (1914) – lyrics by the Gorman Brothers
- "The Garden Gate was Open, My Beautiful Rose was Gone" (1914) – lyrics by J. Keirn Brennan
- "I'd Like to Be in Tennessee (To Marry the Girl I Love)" (1915) – lyrics by Milton Weil and Calib Enix
- "I'm Going Back to Erin (To My Sweet Killarny Rose)" (1915) – lyrics by Will Mar
- "Ump-Da-De-Ump-Da-De-Aye, The Song That My Grandmother Sang" (1915) – lyrics by Caspar Nathan
- "Under the Mellow Arabian Moon" (1915) – lyrics by Caspar Nathan; recorded on 78 rpm disc by Victor Talking Machine Co, vocalists Billy Murray and Irving Kaufman
- "Plant a Little Garden in Your Own Back Yard" (1917) – lyrics by Walter Hirsch and Bert Lewis
- "How Could I Ever Forget You (Beautiful Mother of Mine)" (1919) – lyrics by Emma Carus
- "I'm Mighty Glad to Get Back to My Old Home Town " (1919) – lyrics by Emma Carus and Travis Bradly
- "My Wedding Day" (1919) – lyrics by Emma Carus
- "Oh! How She Can Dance" (1919) – lyrics by Emma Carus
- "John James O'Reilly" (1921) – written with Emma Carus and Herman Kahn
- "Has Anybody Seen My Cat?" (1922) – written with Emma Carus and Dan Blanco
- "Is It a Sin, My Loving You?" (1925) – written with Emma Carus and Vincent Bryan; recorded on 78 rpm disc by multiple labels/artists:
  - Cameo records featuring Harry Smith (Hollywood 1928, 1st recording) and Sid Gary (Hollywood 1928, 2nd recording)
  - Decca Records featuring The Inkspots (NYC 1941)
  - Capitol Records featuring Duke Ellington and His Famous Orchestra with Jimmie Grissom (Hollywood 1940's, Chicago 1953, and Hollywood 1954)
- "My Pal and Me" (1927) – written with F. Langhenry Carver
- "You Wouldn't Fool a Friend?" (1927)
- "Blue-Bird Time" (1941) – lyrics by J. Keirn Brennan
- "I'll Take Care of Your Cares" (1952) – written with Thomas J Tobin
- "Rose of Spain" (1953)

Movie soundtracks

- "Sweepstake Annie" (1935) – composer of "Babbling Tongues" and "Country Folk"

== Personal life ==
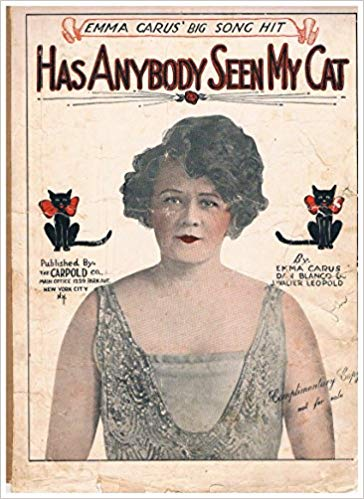
Has Anybody Seen My Cat sheet music with Emma Carus pictured

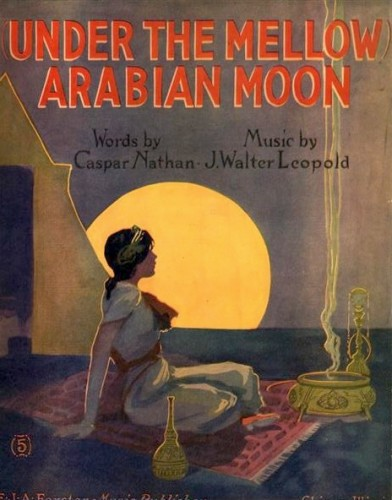
Under the Mellow Arabian Moon sheet music

=== Early life ===
Joseph Walter Leopold was born 27 July 1890, in Brooklyn, New York, to Frank Leopold, a factory cloth examiner, and Ann (Sutterer) Leopold, both originally from Germany. He lived in Brooklyn with his parents and younger brother, J. William, until the early 1910s.

In 1911, he married Gertrude Ethel McNally, and by 1913 they had relocated to Chicago, IL. The Leopolds had one daughter, Ethelreda Leopold, born 2 July 1914, while J. Walter was still working with the Gorman Brothers. He divorced Gertrude in late January 1922, during the time he was performing with Emma Carus.

=== With Emma Carus ===
On 4 August 1922, Leopold and his partner Emma Carus appeared in Chicago's The Daily News, in a story regarding Carus' sentencing in a disorderly conduct case, The case concerned her involvement in a fight that Leopold allegedly started with songwriter Harry Newman (whom he had composed music with earlier in his career). The fight, at the Hotel Sherman in Chicago, apparently started as a result of hotel guests, Mr. and Mrs. Harry Rinaldo, telling Leopold that Newman "had called him an unpleasant name." According to Mr. and Mrs. Newman's testimony, Leopold entered their hotel room behind Carus, who had called ahead to have a chat with Mr. Newman. It was reported that both Carus and Leopold had been drinking. Leopold was said to have shouted, "Now I've got you where I want you!" and began hitting Newman "over the head and the shoulders," while Carus urged Leopold to, "Give it to him right and left," as she struggled with Mrs. Newman to keep her from calling for help.

In April 1926, Leopold and Carus married in Glendale, CA. However, the union did not last long. Only 23 days later, Carus filed for divorce, citing cruelty as the grounds. Shortly after their split, in October 1926, Carus, whose health had been declining, was declared mentally incompetent, and was committed to Casa del Mar Sanatorium in Los Angeles. She died there on 18 November 1927.

=== Heir to an Estate ===
Soon after Carus' death, it was revealed that Leopold's divorce from Carus had never been finalized, and he was now an heir to her estate, which totaled approximately $165,000 (equivalent to about $2.4 million in 2019). In November 1926, soon after Carus' internment, Leopold had, "started his action to set aside the divorce, asserting that he had been asked by friends [earlier] not to oppose the divorce because of Miss Carus's [mental] condition." Carus' interlocutory decree of divorce, which didn't terminate the marriage until after a year had elapsed and a final decree obtained, had basically been pre-empted by her death, so the divorce never became final.

Leopold, as administrator of the Carus estate, had to contend with several issues impacting his pending inheritance. First, he had to dispute the claim that Carus' housekeeper, Lydia A. McCann, was owed $36,000 back pay, which the housekeeper asserted was retained by Carus for investment purposes. Second, his ex-wife Gertrude McNally Leopold filed a lawsuit against him to collect over $10,000 in unpaid alimony. Third, Carus' nieces from Germany (the daughters of her half-sister) also filed claims on the estate.

McCann was inarguably the person most damaging to Leopold's claim to the estate. Leopold disputed the claim that Carus agreed to pay the maid a $25 weekly salary (plus lodging), as it was already a third of what Carus herself was taking in weekly, before expenses. In McCann's depositions, she claimed she was more than just a housekeeper to Carus during her years of service (1900–1926), and was more a companion, confidant, and manager of Carus' household and personal property. She stated that Leopold was aware Carus, who suffered from paresis, was having frequent attacks of insanity, and that one day he took Carus out for a short ride, taking advantage of the opportunity to marry her quickly without allowing McCann or others to intervene.

In April 1928, Paul Schnitzler was made co-administrator of the Carus estate, by recommendation of Dr. Gustav Heuser, German consul in New York City, acting on behalf of Carus' 5 nieces (of half blood), with agreement from J. Walter Leopold. Schnitzler had heard McCann's depositions even before Leopold became administrator of the estate, and used the information on the marriage as leverage to compel Leopold to agree to his appointment as co-administrator (reportedly under threat to have the marriage annulled), and to let the German heirs receive 60% of the estate, while Leopold took 40%. Of this 40%, Leopold was to give 15% to Leona Thurber, friend and guardian of Carus in her last years, and whatever amount was to be settled with his ex-wife for the back-alimony lawsuit. McCann initially was pressured to ask for a smaller sum of $2500 for her settlement in order to avoid another $10,000 in court costs, but when those costs were waived by the courts, McCann was emboldened to ask for more. In November 1930, Leopold consented to have Schnitzler offer her $9000. McCann turned this down, and negotiated with Schnitzler to accept a payment of $12,000, which Leopold refused to pay. By this time, about $7500 in court costs had already been expended in court battles with McCann and her lawyers.

In her judgement against Leopold, former wife Gertrude McNally Leopold claimed that J. Walter Leopold paid alimony for only two years, then disappeared and left her and their daughter stranded in Chicago. Leopold denied the claims that he owed her back-alimony of $175 per month, and "asserted that he had made a settlement with his first wife which had been satisfactory until the news of the Carus estate was published."

Carus' half nieces, led by Elizabeth Blohs and Erna Matthews, argued that their aunt was insane when she married Leopold, and "filed suit in a Federal court to have their aunt's marriage voided." Leopold had stated that Carus told him she had no relatives in the U.S. or in Germany.

The settlement of the Carus estate was not finalized until some time in early 1932, and the outcome was not published in the local papers. The papers did note that ex-guardian Leona Thurber was to collect $2300 as her part of the estate, when it was still under final settlement in January 1932. If the earlier conditions of the estate were upheld, this implies that Leopold had received roughly $15,300.

=== Later life ===
In May 1933, Leopold went into business with his brother J. William Leopold, opening the Blue Point Inn, a resort in Brooklyn. The resort advertised fishing, bathing, entertainment, and dancing, with a nightly rate of $3 and a weekly rate of $18.
In the 1936 CA Voter registration list and the 1937 city directory for Los Angeles, Leopold was listed as a salesman.
By 1937, Leopold had married his third wife, Helen, formerly Clara Helen Ennis, originally Clara Helen Piel of Illinois.
In the 1940 census, he listed his occupation as actor.
In 1942, his WWII draft registration card indicated he was a store's protection assistant in LA.
At the time of his death, he was described as being an investigator for loan and credit companies, and a songwriter.

== Death ==
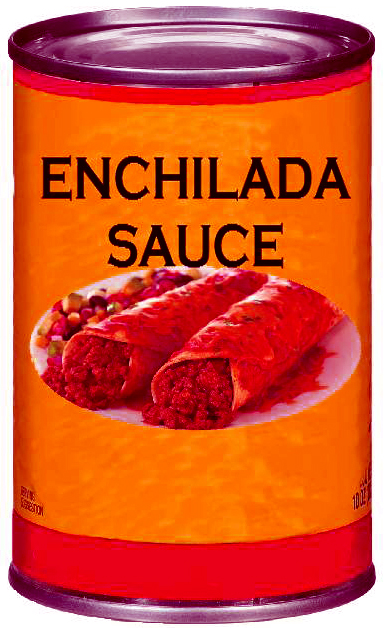

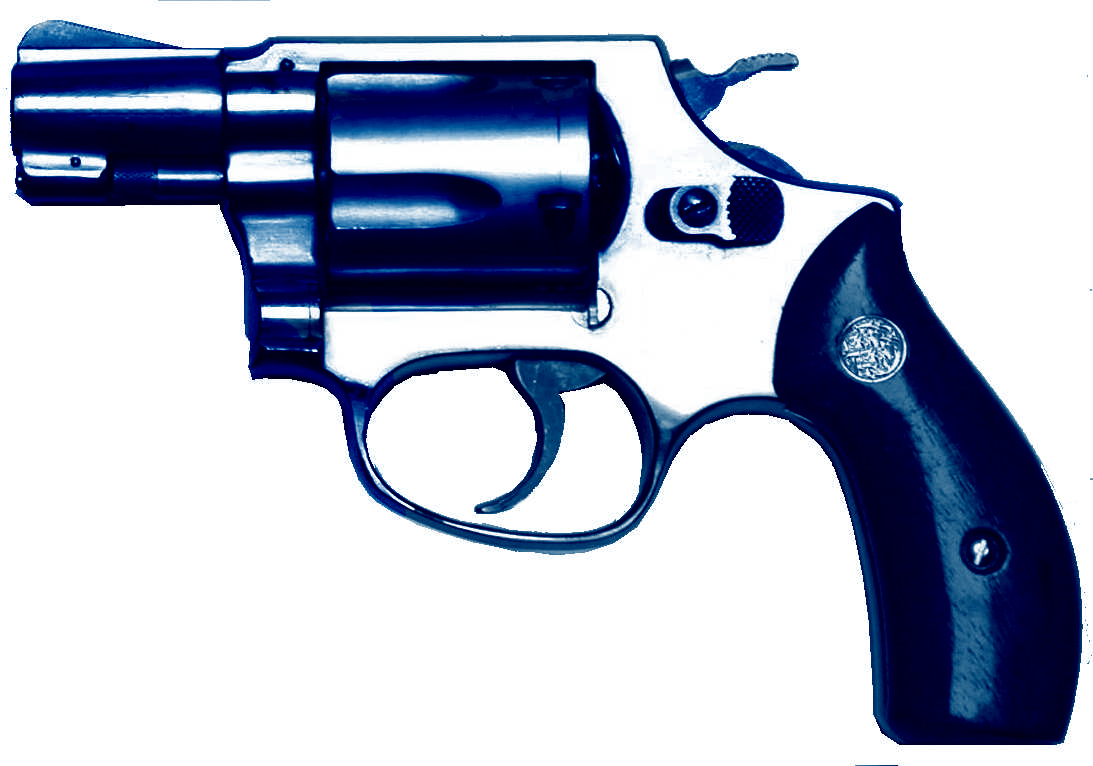

J. Walter Leopold, at age 66, was killed while trying to stop a holdup in a Hollywood market.
On 28 December 1956, a masked gunman, Charles F. Neely, and his getaway driver, Norman Golland, both prison parolees, were holding up a market at 1921 N. Cahuenga Blvd in Hollywood, which was just 0.4 miles from Leopold's home. In an attempt to incapacitate Neely, and break up the robbery, Leopold "threw a can of enchilada sauce to stop the gunman, and struck him in the face." In retaliation, Neely shot Leopold in the temple with a .38 caliber bullet, and fled with about $50 in stolen cash. Leopold died minutes after arriving at Hollywood Receiving Hospital. Neely and Golland were later apprehended. In June 1957, Neely was sentenced to life imprisonment, while Golland (who had waited in the parking lot in a light-green sedan) received a sentence of five years to life.
