= Murray Theater (Richmond, Indiana) =

- U.S. National Register of Historic Places
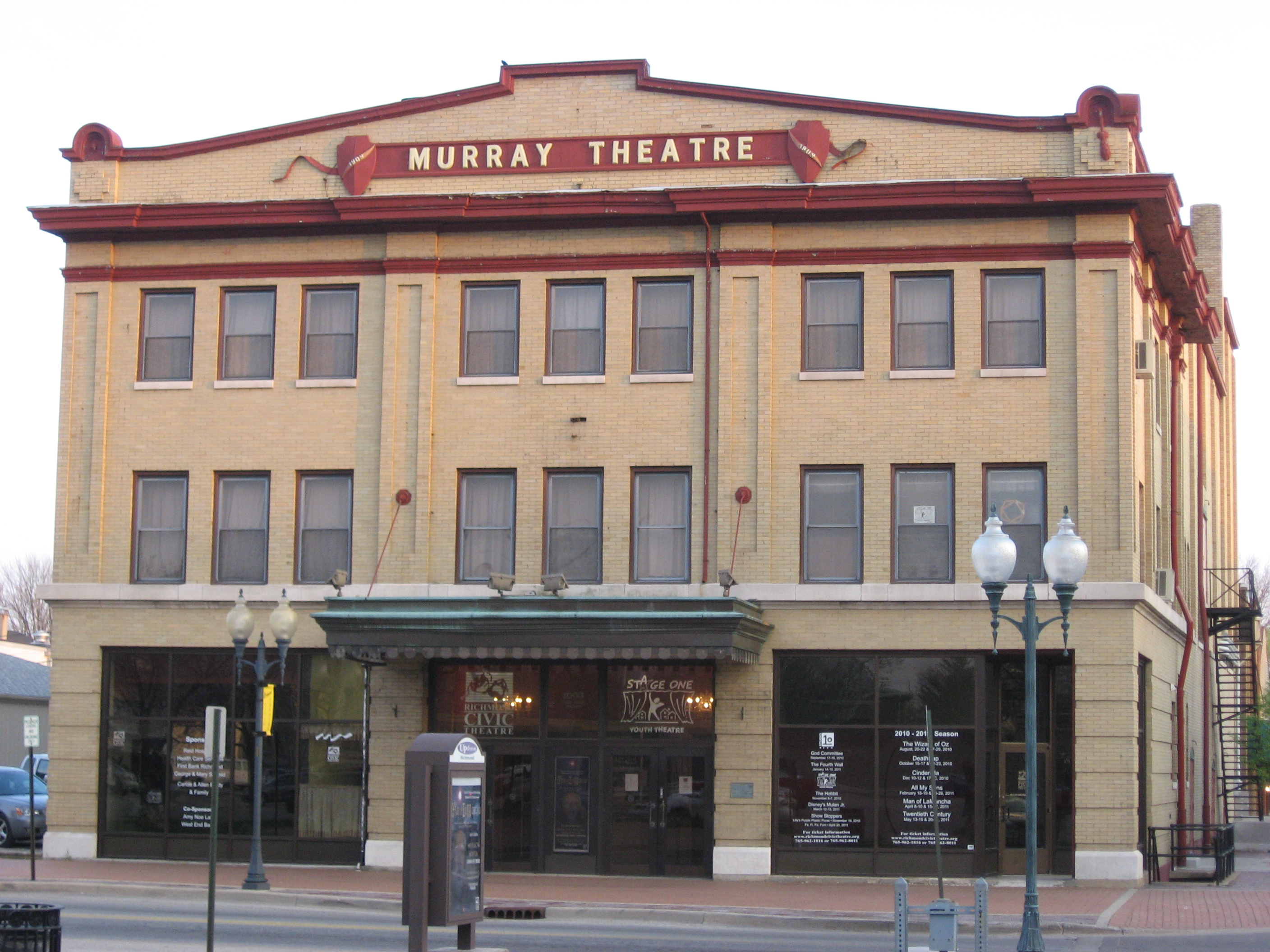
- Murray Theater, April 2011

- Location within Indiana Location within the United States
- Location: 1003 Main St., Richmond, Indiana
- Coordinates: 39°49′44″N 84°53′19″W
- Area: less than one acre
- Built: 1909
- Architect: Elliott, Fred W.
- Architectural style: Chicago, Pueblo
- NRHP reference No.: 82000053
- Added to NRHP: March 25, 1982

Murray Theater, also known as the Richmond Civic Theater-Norbert Silbiger Theater, is a historic theatre building located at Richmond, Indiana. It was built in 1909, and is a three-story, steel frame and brick building with Chicago School and Beaux-Arts style design influences. The auditorium was originally designed to seat 751.

It was listed on the National Register of Historic Places in 1982.
