= List of churches in South Hams =

The following is a list of churches in South Hams, Devon, England.

== Active churches ==
The district has an estimated 102 active churches for 84,300 inhabitants, a ratio of one church to every 826 people.

The only parish without an active church is West Buckfastleigh.

Name	Civil parish	Web	Dedication	Founded	Denomination	Benefice	Notes
St David, Ashprington	Ashprington		David of Wales?	Medieval	Church of England	Totnes Mission Community	
St Andrew, Aveton Gifford	Aveton Gifford		Andrew		Church of England	Modbury Mission Community	
St Mary, Berry Pomeroy	Berry Pomeroy		Mary	Medieval	Church of England	Totnes Mission Community	
St Mary the Virgin, Bickleigh	Bickleigh		Mary	1866	Church of England	Roborough Team	Benefice also includes St Anne, Glenholt in Plymouth
Roborough Methodist Church	Bickleigh (Roborough)			1951	Methodist	Plymouth & Devonport Circuit	Current building 1960
St Cecilia, Woolwell	Bickleigh (Woolwell)		Cecilia	c. 1990s	Church of England	Roborough Team	Meets in Bickleigh Down Primary School
St Lawrence, Bigbury	Bigbury		Lawrence of Rome		Church of England	Modbury Mission Community	
St Michael, Blackawton	Blackawton		Michael		Church of England	Stoke Fleming etc	
St Mary, Brixton	Brixton		Mary		Church of England	Brixton & Yealmpton	
St Peter, Buckland Tout Saints	Buckland Tout Saints		Peter		Church of England	Start Bay Mission Community	
St Mary, West Charleton	Charleton		Mary		Church of England	Start Bay Mission Community	
St Sylvester, Chivelstone	Chivelstone		Pope Sylvester I		Church of England	Start Bay Mission Community	
St Mary, Churchstow	Churchstow		Mary	Medieval	Church of England	Aune Valley Mission Community	
St Michael & All Angels, Cornwood	Cornwood		Michael & Angels	Medieval	Church of England	South Dartmoor Mission Community	
St Peter, Cornworthy	Cornworthy		Peter	Medieval	Church of England	Totnes Mission Community	
St Mary, Dartington	Dartington		Mary	Medieval	Church of England	Totnes Mission Community	New building 1878
St Barnabas, Brooking	Dartington (Brooking)		Barnabas	C19th?	Church of England	Totnes Mission Community	
St Clement, Dartmouth	Dartmouth		Pope Clement I		Church of England	Dartmouth & Dittisham Mission C.	
St Saviour, Dartmouth	Dartmouth		Jesus		Church of England	Dartmouth & Dittisham Mission C.	
St Petrox, Dartmouth	Dartmouth		Petroc		Church of England	Dartmouth & Dittisham Mission C.	
St John the Baptist, Dartmouth	Dartmouth		John the Baptist		Roman Catholic		
Dartmouth Baptist Church	Dartmouth				Baptist Union		
Dartmouth Flavel Church	Dartmouth		John Flavel		Methodist / URC	Torbay Circuit	
St George the Martyr, Dean Prior	Dean Prior		George	Medieval	Church of England	Dart Valley Mission Community	Benefice also includes one church in Buckfastleigh
St Mary the Virgin, Diptford	Diptford		Mary		Church of England	Three Rivers Mission Community	
St George, Dittisham	Dittisham		George		Church of England	Dartmouth & Dittisham Mission C.	
St Andrew, East Allington	East Allington		Andrew		Church of England	Modbury Mission Community	Not contiguous with the other parishes in the benefice
St Winwaloe, East Portlemouth	East Portlemouth		Winwaloe		Church of England	Start Bay Mission Community	
SS Peter & Paul, Ermington	Ermington		Peter & Paul		Church of England	Three Rivers Mission Community	
St Martin, Sherford	Frogmore & Sherford		Martin of Tours		Church of England	Stokenham Mission Community	
St Leonard, Halwell	Halwell & Moreleigh		Leonard of Noblac	Medieval	Church of England	Three Rivers Mission Community	
All Saints, Moreleigh	Halwell & Moreleigh		All Saints	Medieval	Church of England	Three Rivers Mission Community	Built by a local landowner as penance for killing the parish priest
St Andrew, Harberton	Harberton		Andrew	Medieval	Church of England	Three Rivers Mission Community	
St Peter, Harbertonford	Harberton (Harbertonford)		Peter	1859	Church of England	Three Rivers Mission Community	
St Petroc, Harford	Harford		Petroc	Medieval	Church of England	South Dartmoor Mission Community	
All Saints, Holbeton	Holbeton		All Saints	Medieval	Church of England	Yealm & Erme Mission Community	
St Mary the Virgin, Holne	Holne		Mary	Medieval	Church of England	Ashburton Moorland Mission Comm.	
St John the Evangelist, Ivybridge	Ivybridge		John the Evangelist	1882	Church of England	South Dartmoor Mission Community	
St Austin's Priory, Ivybridge	Ivybridge		St Austin ?		Roman Catholic	Ivybridge & Modbury Parish	
Ivybridge Baptist Church	Ivybridge				FIEC		
Ivybridge Methodist Church	Ivybridge				Methodist	Plymouth & Devonport Circuit	
Ivybridge Salvation Army	Ivybridge				Salvation Army		
St Edward, King & Martyr, Kingsbridge	Kingsbridge		Edward the Martyr	Medieval	Church of England	Kingsbridge Mission Community	
St Thomas of Canterbury, Dodbrooke	Kingsbridge (Dodbrooke)		Thomas Becket	Medieval	Church of England	Kingsbridge Mission Community	
Sacred Heart, Kingsbridge	Kingsbridge		Sacred Heart		Roman Catholic	Kingsbridge & Salcombe Parish	
Kingsbridge Family Church	Kingsbridge				Baptist Union		
Kingsbridge Methodist Church	Kingsbridge				Methodist	South Devon Circuit	
Kingsbridge Evangelical Baptist Church	Kingsbridge				Independent		
St James the Less, Kingston	Kingston		James the Less		Church of England	Modbury Mission Community	
St Thomas of Canterbury, Kingswear	Kingswear		Thomas Becket		Church of England	Brixham	Other churches in the benefice are in Torbay
St John the Baptist, Littlehempston	Littlehempston		John the Baptist		Church of England	Dart Valley Mission Community	
St Michael & All Angels, Loddiswell	Loddiswell		Michael & Angels		Church of England	Aune Valley Mission Community	
Loddiswell Congregational Church	Loddiswell			1808	Cong Federation		Rebuilt 1861-1864
All Saints, Malborough	Malborough		All Saints	Medieval	Church of England	Seaside Benefice	
Malborough Baptist Church	Malborough			1815	Baptist Union		
St John the Baptist, Marldon	Marldon		John the Baptist		Church of England	Totnes Mission Community	
St George, Modbury	Modbury		George		Church of England	Modbury Mission Community	
St Monica, Modbury	Modbury		Monica		Roman Catholic	Ivybridge & Modbury Parish	
Holy Cross, Newton Ferrers	Newton & Noss (Newton F)		Cross	Medieval	Church of England	Yealm & Erme Mission Community	
St Peter Revelstoke, Noss Mayo	Newton & Noss (Noss Mayo)		Peter	Medieval	Church of England	Yealm & Erme Mission Community	Began as St John Baptist chapel of ease, St Peter's built 1877
St James, Avonwick	North Huish (Avonwick)		James	1878	Church of England	Three Rivers Mission Community	Proprietary chapel, still owned by the Cornish-Bowden family
Blessed Virgin Mary, Rattery	Rattery		Mary	Medieval	Church of England	South Brent & Rattery	
All Hallows, Ringmore	Ringmore		All Saints		Church of England	Modbury Mission Community	
Holy Trinity, Salcombe	Salcombe		Trinity	1843	Church of England	Seaside Benefice	
Our Lady Star of the Sea, Salcombe	Salcombe		Mary		Roman Catholic	Kingsbridge & Salcombe Parish	
Salcombe Christian Fellowship	Salcombe				Baptist Union		
St Edward, King & Martyr, Shaugh Prior	Shaugh Prior		Edward the Martyr		Church of England	Roborough Team	
St James the Great, Slapton	Slapton		James		Church of England	Start Bay Mission Community	
Slapton Gospel Hall	Slapton				Gospel Hall		
St Petroc, South Brent	South Brent		Petroc		Church of England	South Brent & Rattery	
St Dunstan, South Brent	South Brent		Dunstan		Roman Catholic		
South Brent Methodist Church	South Brent				Methodist	Teignbridge Circuit	
Holy Trinity, South Huish	South Huish (Galmpton)		Trinity	C19th	Church of England	Seaside Benefice	
St Clement, Hope Cove	South Huish (Hope Cove)		Pope Clement I		Church of England	Seaside Benefice	
Hope Cove Methodist Church	South Huish (Hope Cove)				Methodist	South Devon Circuit	
All Saints, South Milton	South Milton		All Saints		Church of England	Aune Valley Mission Community	
SS Nicholas & Cyriac, South Pool	South Pool		Nicholas & Cyriacus		Church of England	Start Bay Mission Community	
All Saints, Sparkwell	Sparkwell		All Saints		Church of England	South Dartmoor Mission Community	
St Paul de Leon, Staverton	Staverton		Paul Aurelian	Medieval	Church of England	Dart Valley Mission Community	
St Matthew, Landscove	Staverton (Landscove)		Matthew	C19th	Church of England	Dart Valley Mission Community	
St Peter, Stoke Fleming	Stoke Fleming		Peter		Church of England	Stoke Fleming etc	
SS Mary & Gabriel, Stoke Gabriel	Stoke Gabriel		Mary & Gabriel	Medieval	Church of England	Totnes Mission Community	
Waddeton Oratory, Stoke Gabriel	Stoke Gabriel (Waddeton)				Church of England	Totnes Mission Community	Private?
St Michael & All Angels, Stokenham	Stokenham		Michael & Angels		Church of England	Stokenham Mission Community	
St Andrew, Beesands	Stokenham (Beesands)		Andrew		Church of England	Stokenham Mission Community	
Chillington Methodist Church	Stokenham (Chillington)				Methodist	South Devon Circuit	
South Hams Christian Fellowship	Stokenham			c. 1980	Independent		
St Michael, Strete	Strete		Michael	1836	Church of England	Stoke Fleming etc	
All Saints, Thurlestone	Thurlestone		All Saints		Church of England	Aune Valley Mission Community	
St Mary, Totnes	Totnes		Mary	Medieval	Church of England	Totnes Mission Community	
St John the Evangelist, Bridgetown	Totnes (Bridgetown)		John the Evangelist	1832	Church of England	Totnes Mission Community	
SS Mary & George, Totnes	Totnes		Mary & George	1902	Roman Catholic		
Totnes United Free Church	Totnes			1877	Baptist Union		Linked with Ichthus
Totnes Methodist Church	Totnes				Methodist	Teignbridge Circuit	
Totnes Gospel Hall	Totnes				Gospel Hall		
St Peter, Ugborough	Ugborough		Peter	Medieval	Church of England	Three Rivers Mission Community	Known as the 'Cathedral of South Hams'
Bittaford Methodist Church	Ugborough (Bittaford)				Methodist	Plymouth & Devonport Circuit	
St Werburgh, Wembury	Wembury		Werburgh		Church of England		
All Saints, West Alvington	West Alvington		All Saints		Church of England	Kingsbridge Mission Community	
St Mary, Woodleigh	Woodleigh		Mary		Church of England	Aune Valley Mission Community	
St Bartholomew, Yealmpton	Yealmpton		Bartholomew		Church of England	Brixton & Yealmpton	
Yealmpton Community Methodist Church	Yealmpton			1909	Methodist	Plymouth & Devonport Circuit	

== Defunct churches ==
Name	Civil parish	Web	Dedication	Founded	Redundant	Denomination	Notes
St Mary, North Huish	North Huish		Mary	Medieval	1993	Church of England	Churches Conservation Trust
