= Grade II* listed buildings in South Hams =

There are over 20,000 Grade II* listed buildings in England. This page is a list of these buildings in the district of South Hams in Devon.

== South Hams ==
Name	Location	Type	Completed (Note: The date given is the date used by Historic England as significant for the initial building or that of an important part in the structure's description.)	Date designated	Grid ref. (Note: The grid reference is based on the British national grid reference system, sometimes known as OSGB36, used by the Ordnance Survey.) Geo-coordinates	Entry number (Note: The "List Entry Number" is a unique number assigned to each listed building and scheduled monument by Historic England.)	Image
Lower Washbourne Barton	Ashprington	Farmhouse	Formerly	9 February 1961	SX8051655259; 50°23′06″N 3°40′55″W	1108384	Upload Photo
Painsford Manor	Painsford, Ashprington	Farmhouse	1952	11 November 1952	SX8006956827; 50°23′57″N 3°41′20″W	1108403	Painsford Manor More images
Summer House about 290 Metres South East of Sharpham	Ashprington	Summerhouse	c1770-1780	26 April 1993	SX8290457674; 50°24′26″N 3°38′57″W	1324937	Summer House about 290 Metres South East of Sharpham More images
Church of St Andrew	Aveton Gifford	Anglican Church	1868	26 January 1967	SX6959047840; 50°18′58″N 3°49′59″W	1108171	Church of St Andrew More images
Deer Park Wall at Berry Pomeroy Castle	Berry Pomeroy	Boundary Wall	Pre 1292	21 May 1985	SX8413462428; 50°27′01″N 3°38′00″W	1108572	Upload Photo
Week	Berry Pomeroy	House	Circa 16th century	9 February 1961	SX8390261368; 50°26′26″N 3°38′11″W	1108575	Upload Photo
Maristow House	Maristow Park, Bickleigh	Country House	1760	29 March 1960	SX4735964542; 50°27′39″N 4°09′07″W	1162231	Maristow House More images
Warleigh House	Warleigh, Bickleigh	House	Earlier	29 March 1960	SX4567761706; 50°26′06″N 4°10′28″W	1162274	Warleigh House More images
Church of St Lawrence	Bigbury	Parish Church	14th century	26 January 1967	SX6678646642; 50°18′17″N 3°52′19″W	1325078	Church of St Lawrence More images
Buckland Tout Saints Hotel	Bearscombe, Buckland-Tout-Saints	Country House	Late 17th century	26 January 1967	SX7593746046; 50°18′05″N 3°44′36″W	1168323	Buckland Tout Saints Hotel More images
Church of St Sylvester	Chivelstone	Parish Church	15th century	26 January 1967	SX7832338746; 50°14′10″N 3°42′27″W	1108470	Church of St Sylvester More images
Manor Farmhouse	South Allington, Chivelstone	Farmhouse	Early 18th century	26 January 1967	SX7940838706; 50°14′10″N 3°41′32″W	1168730	Upload Photo
Church of St Mary	Churchstow	Anglican Church	19th century	28 July 1989	SX7124845911; 50°17′57″N 3°48′33″W	1108148	Church of St Mary More images
Blachford including Service Wing and Stables to East	Blachford Park, Cornwood	House	Circa 16th century	29 March 1960	SX6124659957; 50°25′23″N 3°57′17″W	1309689	Upload Photo
Chapel immediately North West of Fardel Manor House	Fardel, Cornwood	Chapel	may be circa 13th century	29 March 1960	SX6118957442; 50°24′02″N 3°57′16″W	1325390	Upload Photo
Hanger Farm House including Garden Area Wall and Mounting Block Immediately South	Hanger, Cornwood	Farmhouse	late C15/early 16th century	23 April 1952	SX6136258680; 50°24′42″N 3°57′09″W	1309643	Upload Photo
The Slade	Cornwood	House	16th century	23 April 1952	SX5980058496; 50°24′34″N 3°58′28″W	1162516	Upload Photo
Church of St Barnabas	Tigley, Dartington	Chapel of Ease	1885	26 April 1993	SX7594860643; 50°25′57″N 3°44′53″W	1324985	Church of St Barnabas More images
Church of St Mary	Dartington	Parish Church	1878-1880	9 February 1961	SX7853862654; 50°27′04″N 3°42′44″W	1219488	Church of St Mary More images
High Cross Hill House	Dartington Hall, Dartington	House	1932	16 January 1981	SX7936062488; 50°26′59″N 3°42′02″W	1220922	High Cross Hill House More images
Christopher Martin Memorial	Dartington Hall, Dartington	Sculpture	1945-6	26 April 1993	SX7972062536; 50°27′01″N 3°41′44″W	1108324	Christopher Martin Memorial More images
Old Postern	Dartington Hall, Dartington	Kitchen	c. 1860	9 February 1961	SX7868662699; 50°27′06″N 3°42′37″W	1219732	Upload Photo
Britannia Royal Naval College, Main Complex and attached Walls	Dartmouth	Naval Officers House	1899-1905	23 October 1972	SX8760552046; 50°21′27″N 3°34′53″W	1208626	Britannia Royal Naval College, Main Complex and attached Walls More images
Royal Castle Hotel	Dartmouth	Jettied House	1639	14 September 1949	SX8779351372; 50°21′06″N 3°34′43″W	1218065	Royal Castle Hotel More images
The Cherub	Dartmouth	Jettied House	2nd half of 15th century	14 September 1949	SX8778751249; 50°21′02″N 3°34′43″W	1209644	The Cherub More images
The Mansion House	Dartmouth	Apartment	1949	14 September 1949	SX8782351228; 50°21′01″N 3°34′41″W	1197496	Upload Photo
The Old Battery	Dartmouth Castle, Dartmouth	Barracks	1861	23 February 1994	SX8869250280; 50°20′31″N 3°33′56″W	1297087	Upload Photo
4 The Quay	Dartmouth	House	19th century	14 September 1949	SX8782151323; 50°21′04″N 3°34′41″W	1297056	4 The Quay
12 The Quay	Dartmouth	Apartment	1994	14 September 1949	SX8779051383; 50°21′06″N 3°34′43″W	1197587	Upload Photo
13 The Quay	Dartmouth	Apartment	1994	14 September 1949	SX8779351391; 50°21′06″N 3°34′43″W	1292142	13 The Quay
5 Higher Street	Dartmouth	House	c. 1960	11 December 1969	SX8779451270; 50°21′02″N 3°34′43″W	1209616	Upload Photo
Addislade	Dean Prior	Farmhouse	Circa late 16th century	27 May 1986	SX7154264055; 50°27′44″N 3°48′40″W	1325409	Upload Photo
Dean Court	Lower Dean, Dean Prior	Farmhouse	Late 16th century	11 November 1952	SX7328064782; 50°28′09″N 3°47′13″W	1107414	Upload Photo
Bickham Bridge	Diptford	Road Bridge	16th century or early 17th century	9 February 1961	SX7258555385; 50°23′04″N 3°47′37″W	1108342	Bickham Bridge More images
Church of St Andrew	East Allington	Parish Church	13th century	26 January 1967	SX7697248353; 50°19′20″N 3°43′47″W	1108031	Church of St Andrew More images
Church of St Winaloe	East Portlemouth	Parish Church	14th century	26 January 1967	SX7488138357; 50°13′55″N 3°45′20″W	1306828	Church of St Winaloe More images
Keyndon Farmhouse including Secondary Range immediately to the West	Frogmore and Sherford	Farmhouse	15th century	25 October 1951	SX7747143295; 50°16′37″N 3°43′15″W	1108451	Upload Photo
Ranscombe Farmhouse	Frogmore and Sherford	Farmhouse	Early 17th century	26 January 1967	SX7606544896; 50°17′27″N 3°44′28″W	1108453	Upload Photo
Beenleigh	Harberton	House	12th century or 13th century or earlier site of	9 February 1961	SX7972056545; 50°23′47″N 3°41′37″W	1214051	Upload Photo
Church House Inn	Harberton	Cruck House	mid to late 16th century	9 February 1961	SX7778758612; 50°24′53″N 3°43′17″W	1108225	Church House Inn More images
Gate House immediately South East of Beenleigh	Beenleigh, Harberton	Gatehouse	16th century	26 April 1993	SX7973656521; 50°23′46″N 3°41′36″W	1108281	Upload Photo
Flete Lodge	Holbeton	Gate Lodge	1889	19 July 1984	SX6305151932; 50°21′05″N 3°55′35″W	1107778	Flete Lodge More images
Garden Wall immediately South of Mothecombe House	Mothecombe, Holbeton	Garden Wall	Early 18th century	19 July 1984	SX6086147772; 50°18′48″N 3°57′20″W	1168292	Upload Photo
Barn, originally Longhouse, approx 40 Metres West of Inglettes Farmhouse	Holne	Barn	Circa early 16th century	27 May 1986	SX6958368961; 50°30′21″N 3°50′26″W	1147349	Barn, originally Longhouse, approx 40 Metres West of Inglettes Farmhouse More images
Holne Bridge	Holne	Road Bridge	c. 1413	9 February 1961	SX7301670585; 50°31′16″N 3°47′34″W	1107419	Holne Bridge More images
Knowle House	Kingsbridge	House	C17/Early 18th century	13 December 1949	SX7346944641; 50°17′17″N 3°46′39″W	1249361	Upload Photo
The Old Grammar School	Kingsbridge	Grammar School	1670	13 December 1949	SX7343444566; 50°17′15″N 3°46′41″W	1325371	The Old Grammar School More images
The Shambles	Kingsbridge	Market	1586	13 December 1949	SX7343244399; 50°17′09″N 3°46′41″W	1165593	The Shambles More images
Church of St James the Less	Kingston	Church	14th century	26 January 1967	SX6352947795; 50°18′51″N 3°55′05″W	1166006	Church of St James the Less More images
Wonwell Court	Wonwell, Kingston	Kitchen	16th century	25 October 1951	SX6295847598; 50°18′44″N 3°55′34″W	1309086	Upload Photo
Greenway House	Kingswear	Country House	1780-1790	21 May 1985	SX8720954755; 50°22′55″N 3°35′16″W	1108548	Greenway House More images
Nethway House	Kingswear	House	1949	18 October 1949	SX9025452141; 50°21′32″N 3°32′39″W	1146591	Upload Photo
Gatcombe House	Littlehempston	Apartment	1969	9 February 1969	SX8211362439; 50°27′00″N 3°39′43″W	1108554	Upload Photo
Hampstead Manor	Littlehempston	Farmhouse	16th century	9 February 1961	SX8042561624; 50°26′32″N 3°41′07″W	1324864	Upload Photo
Church of St Michael and All Angels	Loddiswell	Church	19th century	26 January 1967	SX7209848649; 50°19′26″N 3°47′53″W	1108121	Church of St Michael and All Angels More images
Barn immediately North of Compton Castle	Compton, Marldon	Barn	Circa 18th century	21 May 1985	SX8654064903; 50°28′23″N 3°36′01″W	1108518	Barn immediately North of Compton Castle More images
Chain House	Modbury	Clothiers House	Early 18th century	25 January 1990	SX6586851685; 50°20′59″N 3°53′12″W	1325095	Chain House
Old Traine East & Old Traine West	Traine, Modbury	House	1990	26 January 1967	SX6609451911; 50°21′07″N 3°53′01″W	1147100	Upload Photo
Church of St Peter	Noss Mayo, Newton and Noss	Parish Church	1882	29 March 1960	SX5499447753; 50°18′43″N 4°02′16″W	1325259	Church of St Peter More images
Courtyard Walls, Gatepiers and Outbuilding immediately South East of Puslinch House	Newton and Noss	Gate	circa early 18th century	19 July 1984	SX5699950877; 50°20′25″N 4°00′39″W	1168902	Upload Photo
Garden Walls immediately to South of Puslinch House	Newton and Noss	Gate Pier	c. 1720	19 July 1984	SX5693250853; 50°20′25″N 4°00′43″W	1325264	Upload Photo
Gnaton Hall	Newton Ferrers, Newton and Noss	Country House	c. 1826	29 March 1960	SX5799049745; 50°19′50″N 3°59′48″W	1325263	Gnaton Hall
Parsonage Farmhouse	Newton Ferrers, Newton and Noss	Farmhouse	Medieval	19 July 1984	SX5521448605; 50°19′10″N 4°02′07″W	1168805	Upload Photo
Black Hall	Avonwick, North Huish	Country House	circa 1820s	9 February 1961	SX7128657641; 50°24′16″N 3°48′45″W	1216358	Upload Photo
Church House Inn	Rattery	Inn	16th century	9 February 1961	SX7400861543; 50°26′25″N 3°46′32″W	1308433	Church House Inn More images
Luscombe Farmhouse	Rattery	Farmhouse	16th century	27 May 1986	SX7482963731; 50°27′36″N 3°45′53″W	1147441	Upload Photo
Syon Abbey	Rattery	Country House	18th century	9 February 1961	SX7242661067; 50°26′08″N 3°47′52″W	1147483	Syon Abbey
Church of All Hallows	Ringmore	Anglican Church	1915	26 January 1967	SX6526845993; 50°17′54″N 3°53′35″W	1108047	Church of All Hallows More images
Church of the Holy Trinity	Salcombe	Church	1843	3 May 1949	SX7400539198; 50°14′22″N 3°46′05″W	1212759	Church of the Holy Trinity More images
Old Porch House	Salcombe	House	1660	27 February 1974	SX7393939156; 50°14′20″N 3°46′09″W	1213252	Upload Photo
Snapes Manor	Batson Creek, Salcombe	House	12th century	3 May 1949	SX7408439743; 50°14′39″N 3°46′02″W	1212753	Upload Photo
The Grange	Salcombe	House	Late 18th century	3 May 1949	SX7405138856; 50°14′10″N 3°46′03″W	1212730	Upload Photo
Woodcot	Salcombe	House	1797	3 May 1949	SX7362538456; 50°13′57″N 3°46′24″W	1212788	Upload Photo
Truelove Farm House	Truelove, Shaugh Prior	Farmhouse	Late 16th century	29 March 1960	SX5518660706; 50°25′42″N 4°02′25″W	1162826	Upload Photo
Ruins of Church of St Andrew	South Huish	Parish Church	13th century	26 January 1967	SX6951941112; 50°15′20″N 3°49′54″W	1108465	Ruins of Church of St Andrew More images
Barn approximately 30 Metres to the North East of Court Barton	South Pool	Threshing Barn	Circa late 16th century or early 17th century	19 February 1990	SX7767740352; 50°15′02″N 3°43′02″W	1108438	Upload Photo
Scoble	South Pool	Farmhouse	Circa 1720 - 40	26 January 1967	SX7601739874; 50°14′45″N 3°44′25″W	1169744	Upload Photo
Gate Piers approximately 1300 Metres North West of Boringdon Hall	Plympton, Sparkwell	Gate Pier	Late 17th century	9 November 1998	SX5283858394; 50°24′25″N 4°04′20″W	1245698	Upload Photo
Gatepiers and Garden Boundary Wall immediately to East of Great Stert Farm House	Sparkwell	Gate Pier	Circa late 17th century	29 March 1960	SX5982257524; 50°24′03″N 3°58′26″W	1162976	Upload Photo
Great Stert Farm House	Sparkwell	Farmhouse	Circa early 17th century	29 March 1960	SX5979257523; 50°24′03″N 3°58′27″W	1107406	Upload Photo
Newnham Park	Newnham Park, Sparkwell	Country House	c. 1700	20 March 1960	SX5556057937; 50°24′13″N 4°02′02″W	1309444	Newnham Park More images
Church of St Matthew	Landscove, Staverton	Parish Church	1849-1850	21 May 1985	SX7744666389; 50°29′04″N 3°43′44″W	1108532	Church of St Matthew More images
Dovecote approximately 100 Metres North West of Pridhamsleigh Manor	Staverton	Dovecote	circa 16th century	9 February 1961	SX7489067774; 50°29′47″N 3°45′55″W	1108528	Upload Photo
Kingston House	Staverton	Country House	1743	11 November 1952	SX7947165460; 50°28′36″N 3°42′00″W	1108525	Kingston House More images
Pridhamsleigh Manor Farm House	Staverton	Farmhouse	16th century	11 November 1952	SX7492567665; 50°29′43″N 3°45′53″W	1147332	Upload Photo
Woodend Farmhouse	Staverton	Farmhouse	Circa early 16th century or earlier	21 May 1985	SX7487568700; 50°30′17″N 3°45′57″W	1308548	Upload Photo
Woolston Green Farmhouse	Woolston Green, Staverton	Farmhouse	circa late 15th century or early 16th century	21 May 1985	SX7770166157; 50°28′57″N 3°43′31″W	1108491	Upload Photo
Church of St Peter	Stoke Fleming	Parish Church	13th century	26 January 1967	SX8620148311; 50°19′25″N 3°36′00″W	1325163	Church of St Peter More images
Sandridge Park	Stoke Gabriel	Country House	1805	11 November 1952	SX8599056475; 50°23′49″N 3°36′20″W	1108493	Sandridge Park More images
Widdicombe House	Stokenham	Country House	1720-5	25 October 1951	SX8119641729; 50°15′49″N 3°40′05″W	1107963	Upload Photo
Gate-piers about 100 Metres South South East of Higher Fuge	Strete	Gate Pier	18th century	25 March 1991	SX8323748058; 50°19′15″N 3°38′30″W	1107950	Upload Photo
Higher Fuge	Strete	Farmhouse	1726	26 January 1967	SX8319248153; 50°19′18″N 3°38′32″W	1165419	Upload Photo
Church of All Saints	Thurlestone	Parish Church	13th century	26 January 1967	SX6732442882; 50°16′15″N 3°51′47″W	1324947	Church of All Saints More images
Barclay's Bank	Totnes	Bank	c. 1585	7 January 1952	SX8021260429; 50°25′53″N 3°41′17″W	1236275	Barclay's Bank More images
Church House	Totnes	House	Modern	7 January 1952	SX8022560443; 50°25′54″N 3°41′16″W	1264772	Church House More images
Eastgate House	Totnes	Inn	renamed in 1642	7 January 1952	SX8027160417; 50°25′53″N 3°41′14″W	1236273	Eastgate House
Follaton House (South Hams District Council offices)	Totnes	Country House	Early 19th century	7 January 1952	SX7870160467; 50°25′53″N 3°42′33″W	1235624	Follaton House (South Hams District Council offices) More images
King Edward VI School	Totnes	House	17th century	7 January 1952	SX8042460369; 50°25′51″N 3°41′06″W	1235862	King Edward VI School More images
Outbuilding to rear of No 39 (former Kitchen Block), Butterwalk	Totnes	Kitchen	Former	28 October 1981	SX8012860486; 50°25′55″N 3°41′21″W	1237072	Upload Photo
Priory Gate House, Fore Street	Totnes	House	possibly former	7 January 1952	SX8031160427; 50°25′53″N 3°41′12″W	1235702	Priory Gate House, Fore Street More images
Priory House	Totnes	House	later 17th century	7 January 1952	SX8024560606; 50°25′59″N 3°41′15″W	1264386	Upload Photo
The Royal Seven Stars Hotel	Totnes	Courtyard	Late 17th century	7 January 1952	SX8056560364; 50°25′51″N 3°40′59″W	1236781	The Royal Seven Stars Hotel More images
Totnes Bridge	Bridgetown, Totnes	Bridge	1826-1828	7 January 1952	SX8067360300; 50°25′49″N 3°40′53″W	1107495	Totnes Bridge More images
Nos 34, 34a and 34b (flat), Fore Street	Totnes	Apartment	Late 18th century	25 March 1969	SX8044160375; 50°25′52″N 3°41′05″W	1264900	Nos 34, 34a and 34b (flat), Fore Street More images
48 Fore Street	Totnes	Kitchen	later 16th century or early 17th century	7 January 1952	SX8038060391; 50°25′52″N 3°41′08″W	1264828	Upload Photo
50 Fore Street	Totnes	House	late 16th century or early 17th century	7 January 1952	SX8037260393; 50°25′52″N 3°41′08″W	1235797	50 Fore Street More images
52 Fore Street	Totnes	House	17th century	7 January 1952	SX8036660395; 50°25′52″N 3°41′09″W	1235939	52 Fore Street More images
54 Fore Street	Totnes	House	c. 1607	7 January 1952	SX8036160396; 50°25′52″N 3°41′09″W	1264832	54 Fore Street More images
64 Fore Street	Totnes, South Hams	House	Early 19th century	7 January 1952	SX8032160406; 50°25′53″N 3°41′11″W	1264833	64 Fore Street More images
68 Fore Street	Totnes	House	Mid 18th century	7 January 1952	SX8031060409; 50°25′53″N 3°41′12″W	1264834	68 Fore Street More images
8 High Street	Totnes	House	Extended	7 January 1952	SX8024560423; 50°25′53″N 3°41′15″W	1236315	8 High Street
10, 10a and 10b High Street	Totnes	House	Early 17th century	7 January 1952	SX8023160419; 50°25′53″N 3°41′16″W	1264676	10, 10a and 10b High Street More images
22 High Street	Totnes	House	early to mid 19th century	25 March 1969	SX8019460431; 50°25′53″N 3°41′18″W	1264633	22 High Street
26 High Street	Totnes	House	Early 18th century	7 January 1952	SX8018160432; 50°25′53″N 3°41′18″W	1236350	26 High Street More images
28 High Street	Totnes	House	Early 18th century	7 January 1952	SX8017660433; 50°25′53″N 3°41′18″W	1264634	28 High Street More images
32 High Street	Totnes	House	c. 1560	7 January 1952	SX8016060434; 50°25′53″N 3°41′19″W	1264635	32 High Street More images
33 High Street	Totnes	House	later 16th century	7 January 1952	SX8014160460; 50°25′54″N 3°41′20″W	1264727	33 High Street More images
39 and 41 High Street	Totnes	House	c. 1624	7 January 1952	SX8012260461; 50°25′54″N 3°41′21″W	1236133	39 and 41 High Street More images
55 High Street	Totnes	House	later 16th century	7 January 1952	SX8007760466; 50°25′54″N 3°41′23″W	1236135	55 High Street More images
10 Warland	Totnes	House	early 16th century (after 1508)	16 March 1978	SX8048060177; 50°25′45″N 3°41′03″W	1236977	10 Warland More images
Cross Re-used as Gate Post immediately South East of Haredon Farmhouse	Ugborough	Gate	Medieval	18 February 1985	SX6733055187; 50°22′54″N 3°52′03″W	1307167	Upload Photo
Haredon Farmhouse	Ugborough	Farmhouse	Circa late 15th century	19 February 1985	SX6732055192; 50°22′54″N 3°52′03″W	1107371	Upload Photo
Fort Bovisand	Wembury	Battery	1861-1869	12 November 1999	SX4875550663; 50°20′11″N 4°07′36″W	1379615	Fort Bovisand More images
Garden Wall, Steps and Gate Piers immediately South of Langdon Court Hotel	Langdon, Wembury	Gate Pier	circa early 18th century	19 July 1984	SX5147349687; 50°19′42″N 4°05′17″W	1169143	Upload Photo
Hele Almshouses	Wembury	Almshouse	1682	29 March 1984	SX5325049415; 50°19′35″N 4°03′47″W	1306680	Hele Almshouses More images
Langdon Court Hotel	Langdon, Wembury	Country House	Medieval	29 March 1960	SX5148149722; 50°19′43″N 4°05′17″W	1324841	Langdon Court Hotel More images
Pair of Garden Houses approximately 35 Metres South of Langdon Court Hotel	Langdon, Wembury	Gazebo	circa early 18th century	29 March 1960	SX5147349665; 50°19′41″N 4°05′17″W	1108587	Upload Photo
Two Pairs of Gate Piers adjoining South West and South East of Langdon Court Hotel	Langdon, Wembury	Gate Pier	17th century	29 March 1960	SX5150749701; 50°19′43″N 4°05′15″W	1169129	Two Pairs of Gate Piers adjoining South West and South East of Langdon Court Hotel
Wall Approximately 90 Metres West of Wembury House	Wembury	Wall	circa late 16th century	19 July 1984	SX5303549189; 50°19′27″N 4°03′57″W	1169185	Upload Photo
Wembury House	Wembury	Country House	1803-6	23 April 1952	SX5312049207; 50°19′28″N 4°03′53″W	1108590	Upload Photo
Old Stones and School Cottage & Pay Cottage	West Alvington	Cruck House	Circa early 16th century	25 October 1951	SX7244043836; 50°16′50″N 3°47′30″W	1324917	Upload Photo
Brook Manor House	West Buckfastleigh	Manor House	1656	27 May 1986	SX7132967680; 50°29′41″N 3°48′56″W	1168435	Upload Photo
Church of St Mary	Woodleigh	Sundial	1707	26 January 1967	SX7378648842; 50°19′33″N 3°46′28″W	1108128	Church of St Mary More images
Church of St Bartholomew	Yealmpton	Parish Church	1850	29 March 1960	SX5777651701; 50°20′53″N 4°00′01″W	1306637	Church of St Bartholomew More images
Former Stables approximately 60 Metres North West of Lyneham House	Lyneham, Yealmpton	Stable	c. 1700	29 March 1960	SX5782153492; 50°21′51″N 4°00′01″W	1324866	Upload Photo
Goreus Stone	Yealmpton	Gravestone	C3	19 July 1984	SX5775451697; 50°20′53″N 4°00′02″W	1169259	Upload Photo
