= 2023 South Hams District Council election =

2023 English local election

← 2019	4 May 2023	2027 →

All 31 seats on South Hams District Council 16 seats needed for a majority

	First party	Second party	Third party
Leader	Julian Brazil	Judy Pearce	Jacqi Hodgson
Party	Liberal Democrats	Conservative	Green
Last election	10 seats, 30.6%	16 seats, 38.1%	3 seats, 12.3%
Seats before	10	16	2
Seats after	19	7	3
Seat change	▲9	▼9	Steady
Popular vote	19,931	14,359	5,733
Percentage	43.2%	31.1%	12.4%
Swing	▲12.6%	▼7.0%	▲0.1%
	Fourth party	Fifth party
Leader		Mark Long
Party	Labour	Independent
Last election	0 seats, 13.9%	2 seats, 5.1%
Seats before	0	3
Seats after	1	1
Seat change	▲1	▼1
Popular vote	3,521	2,299
Percentage	7.6%	5.0%
Swing	▼6.3%	▼0.1%
- Results by ward
Leader before election
Judy Pearce
Conservative
Leader after election
Julian Brazil
Liberal Democrats

The 2023 South Hams District Council election took place on 4 May 2023 to elect all 31 members of South Hams District Council in Devon, England. This was on the same day as other local elections across England. All 20 wards were up for election, each with either one, two or three councillors to be elected.

The council was under Conservative majority control prior to the election, with the leader of the council being Judy Pearce, who had led the council since 2019. She did not stand for re-election.

The election saw the Liberal Democrats win a majority of the seats on the council for the first time in its history. Liberal Democrat group leader Julian Brazil was appointed leader of the council at the subsequent annual council meeting on 25 May 2023.

== Results summary ==
2023 South Hams District Council election
Party	Candidates	Seats	Gains	Losses	Net gain/loss	Seats %	Votes %	Votes	+/−
Liberal Democrats	27	19	9	0	▲9	61.3	43.2	19,931	▲12.6
Conservative	30	7	0	9	▼9	22.6	31.1	14,359	▼7.0
Green	14	3	0	0	Steady	9.7	12.4	5,733	▲0.1
Labour	7	1	1	0	▲1	3.2	7.6	3,521	▼6.3
Independent	4	1	0	1	▼1	3.2	5.0	2,299	▼0.1
TUSC	1	0	0	0	Steady	0.0	0.3	149	N/A
Heritage	2	0	0	0	Steady	0.0	0.3	128	N/A

== Ward results ==
Sitting councillors are marked with an asterisk (*).

=== Allington & Strete ===
Allington & Strete
Party	Candidate	Votes	%	±%
Liberal Democrats	Laurel Lawford	628	55.7	+17.5
Conservative	Richard Foss*	412	36.5	−6.3
Green	Joseph Waters	88	7.8	−7.2
Rejected ballots		10		
Turnout		1,138	47.24	+3.12
Liberal Democrats gain from Conservative		Swing	11.9	

=== Bickleigh & Cornwood ===
Bickleigh & Cornwood
Party	Candidate	Votes	%	±%
Liberal Democrats	Christopher Oram	435	54.9	N/A
Conservative	Barrie Spencer*	357	45.1	−31.0
Rejected ballots		5		
Turnout		797	35.06	+3.39
Liberal Democrats gain from Conservative		Swing	N/A	

=== Blackawton & Stoke Fleming Ward ===
Blackawton & Stoke Fleming
Party	Candidate	Votes	%	±%
Liberal Democrats	Simon Rake	527	56.7	+10.6
Conservative	Helen Reeve*	402	43.3	−4.1
Rejected ballots		2		
Turnout		929	44.02	−0.97
Liberal Democrats gain from Conservative		Swing	7.3	

=== Charterlands ===
Charterlands
Party	Candidate	Votes	%	±%
Conservative	Bernard Taylor*	523	50.7	−1.6
Liberal Democrats	Alan Kirk	509	49.3	+16.9
Rejected ballots		8		
Turnout		1,040	42.71	−2.21
Conservative hold		Swing	-9.2	

=== Dartington & Staverton ===
Dartington & Staverton
Party	Candidate	Votes	%	±%
Green	Jacqi Hodgson*	740	72.3	−9.2
Conservative	Jeremy Luck	154	15.1	−3.4
Liberal Democrats	Catherine Pannell	129	12.6	N/A
Rejected ballots		4		
Turnout		1,027	45.3	−2.9
Green hold		Swing	-2.9	

=== Dartmouth & East Dart ===
Dartmouth & East Dart Ward (3 seats)
Party	Candidate	Votes	%	±%
Labour	Ben Cooper	1,235	52.0	+23.3
Conservative	Jonathan Hawkins*	1,135	47.8	−3.1
Liberal Democrats	Ged Yardy	1,121	47.2	+15.4
Conservative	Hilary Bastone*	930	39.1	−9.3
Conservative	Rosemary Rowe*	836	35.2	−0.3
Independent	Kim Sturgess	299	12.6	N/A
Rejected ballots		12		
Turnout		2,388	39.28	−5.62
Labour gain from Conservative		Swing	N/A	
Conservative hold		Swing	N/A	
Liberal Democrats gain from Conservative		Swing	N/A	

=== Ermington & Ugborough ===
Ermington & Ugborough
Party	Candidate	Votes	%	±%
Liberal Democrats	Alison DeWynter	534	57.0	+37.7
Conservative	Richard Hosking	298	31.8	−27.1
Green	Meirion Jones	105	11.2	N/A
Rejected ballots		5		
Turnout		942	40.05	+1.10
Liberal Democrats gain from Conservative		Swing	32.4	

=== Ivybridge East ===
Ivybridge East (2 seats)
Party	Candidate	Votes	%	±%
Liberal Democrats	Victor Abbott*	755	54.9	+9.6
Liberal Democrats	Matt Steele	596	43.3	N/A
Conservative	Karen Pringle*	412	30.0	−14.6
Conservative	Helen Hillman	342	24.9	−13.3
Labour	David Trigger	218	15.9	−21.1
Green	Hilary Jones	183	13.3	N/A
Green	Richard Hoyland	100	7.3	N/A
Rejected ballots		2		
Turnout		1,377	29.9	−0.43
Liberal Democrats hold		Swing	N/A	
Liberal Democrats gain from Conservative		Swing	N/A	

=== Ivybridge West ===
Ivybridge West (2 seats)
Party	Candidate	Votes	%	±%
Liberal Democrats	Nadine Dommett	882	57.2	+25.5
Liberal Democrats	Pablo Munoz	810	52.6	N/A
Conservative	Lance Austen*	438	28.4	−24.1
Conservative	Stanley Murphy	304	19.7	−29.8
Green	Nick Hart-Williams	184	11.9	N/A
Green	Alistair Henderson	164	10.6	N/A
TUSC	Tony Rea	149	9.7	−29.2
Rejected ballots		11		
Turnout		1,552	31.81	+2.21
Liberal Democrats gain from Conservative		Swing	N/A	
Liberal Democrats gain from Conservative		Swing	N/A	

=== Kingsbridge ===
Kingsbridge (2 seats)
Party	Candidate	Votes	%	±%
Liberal Democrats	Denise O'Callaghan*	1,011	67.0	+17.7
Liberal Democrats	Susie Jackson*	907	60.1	+15.2
Conservative	Helen Baker	584	38.7	+4.6
Conservative	Thomas Greaves	331	21.9	−10.9
Rejected ballots		5		
Turnout		1,515	34.38	−2.52
Liberal Democrats hold		Swing	N/A	
Liberal Democrats hold		Swing	N/A	

=== Loddiswell & Aveton Gifford ===
Loddiswell & Aveton Gifford
Party	Candidate	Votes	%	±%
Liberal Democrats	Lee Bonham	487	58.2	+11.2
Conservative	Paul Holmes	260	31.1	−8.5
Labour	Paul Furlong	90	10.7	−1.8
Rejected ballots		1		
Turnout		838	38.33	+1.83
Liberal Democrats hold		Swing	9.8	

=== Marldon & Littlehempston ===
Marldon & Littlehempston
Party	Candidate	Votes	%	±%
Conservative	Samantha Penfold	355	44.6	+21.7
Liberal Democrats	Keith Smith	262	33.0	+19.0
Green	David Bradbury	178	22.4	+8.4
Rejected ballots		5		
Turnout		800	34.48	−4.19
Conservative gain from Independent		Swing	N/A	

=== Newton & Yealmpton ===
Newton & Yealmpton (2 seats)
Party	Candidate	Votes	%	±%
Liberal Democrats	Dan Thomas*	1,433	70.3	+12.5
Liberal Democrats	Tom Eadie	1,225	60.1	−2.5
Conservative	Tony Carlson	580	28.4	−2.7
Labour	Peter Gold	259	12.7	+4.8
Rejected ballots		7		
Turnout		2,046	41.31	−0.10
Liberal Democrats hold		Swing	N/A	
Liberal Democrats hold		Swing	N/A	

=== Salcombe and Thurlestone ===
Salcombe and Thurlestone (2 seats)
Party	Candidate	Votes	%	±%
Independent	Mark Long*	1,160	63.7	+2.5
Conservative	Samantha Dennis	618	34.0	−4.0
Conservative	Jim Heaven	513	28.2	−8.1
Independent	Nikki Turton	447	24.6	N/A
Green	Lewis Worrall	257	14.1	N/A
Liberal Democrats	Alan Kerr	229	12.6	−4.7
Rejected ballots		4		
Turnout		1,824	45.76	−3.02
Independent hold		Swing	N/A	
Conservative hold		Swing	N/A	

=== South Brent ===
South Brent (2 seats)
Party	Candidate	Votes	%	±%
Liberal Democrats	Guy Pannell*	1,168	58.9	+23.5
Liberal Democrats	David Hancock	1,013	51.1	+18.9
Conservative	Peter Smerdon*	685	34.5	−1.6
Conservative	Lister Bass	533	26.9	−7.8
Green	Steve Nayar	370	18.7	−1.5
Rejected ballots		15		
Turnout		1,998	47.26	−2.70
Liberal Democrats hold		Swing	N/A	
Liberal Democrats gain from Conservative		Swing	N/A	

=== Stokenham ===
Stokenham
Party	Candidate	Votes	%	±%
Liberal Democrats	Julian Brazil*	712	73.9	+6.5
Conservative	Joshua Gardner	193	20.0	−9.1
Green	Lucy Fleming	58	6.0	N/A
Rejected ballots		3		
Turnout		966	45.1	−2.37
Liberal Democrats hold		Swing	7.8	

=== Totnes ===
Totnes (3 seats)
Party	Candidate	Votes	%	±%
Liberal Democrats	John Birch*	1,490	51.0	+6.1
Green	Georgina Allen	1,433	49.0	+6.5
Green	Anna Presswell	971	33.2	−0.3
Liberal Democrats	John Anderson	948	32.4	+4.1
Green	John Cummings	902	30.9	+2.8
Liberal Democrats	John Lloyd	799	27.3	−1.8
Labour	Jill Hannam	482	16.5	−4.1
Independent	Jo Sweett*	393	13.4	−29.1
Conservative	Richard O'Connor	310	10.6	−1.2
Conservative	Helena Penfold	264	9.0	N/A
Conservative	Jamie Rogers	251	8.6	N/A
Heritage	Jason Liosatos	72	2.5	N/A
Heritage	Becca Collings	56	1.9	N/A
Rejected ballots		4		
Turnout		2,927	42.47	−3.85
Liberal Democrats hold		Swing	N/A	
Green hold		Swing	N/A	
Green hold		Swing	N/A	

Jo Sweett had been elected as a Green councillor in 2019, but left the party in 2021 to sit as an independent councillor. Seat shown as a Green hold for comparison with the 2019 result.

=== Wembury and Brixton ===
Wembury and Brixton (2 seats)
Party	Candidate	Votes	%	±%
Conservative	Julie Carson	733	44.1	−9.3
Conservative	Alison Nix	718	43.2	−5.5
Labour	Steve Oliver	657	39.5	+26.4
Labour	Ed Parsons	580	34.9	N/A
Liberal Democrats	Brian Blake	400	24.1	+6.9
Rejected ballots		13		
Turnout		1,676	36.16	−4.06
Conservative hold		Swing	N/A	
Conservative hold		Swing	N/A	

=== West Dart ===
West Dart
Party	Candidate	Votes	%	±%
Liberal Democrats	John McKay*	699	65.9	+1.7
Conservative	Stuart Greaves	362	34.1	−1.7
Rejected ballots		16		
Turnout		1,077	52.72	+6.52
Liberal Democrats hold		Swing	1.7	

=== Woolwell ===
Woolwell
Party	Candidate	Votes	%	±%
Conservative	Nicky Hopwood*	526	70.3	−15.6
Liberal Democrats	Claire Hutson	222	29.7	N/A
Rejected ballots		4		
Turnout		752	33.48	−1.32
Conservative hold		Swing	N/A	
