= Ermington Hundred =

Ancient administrative unit of Devon, England

The hundred of Ermington was the name of one of thirty two ancient administrative units of Devon, England. It was active until the end of the 19th century when more specialized governmental units assumed its many roles.

Ermington hundred was composed of the parishes of Abbots Ash, Aveton Gifford, Bigbury, Cornwood, Ermington, Flete, Harford, Modbury, Newton Ferrers, Okenbury, Ringmore and Ugborough from the division of the larger ancient Domesday hundred of Alleriga. Some Domesday parishes were combined i.e. Abbots Ash and Flete created the parish of Holbeton. The hundred Court was originally held at Ermington.

The parishes in the hundred at the beginning of the 20th century were: Aveton Gifford; Bigbury; Cornwood; Ermington; Harford; Holbeton; Kingston; Modbury; Newton Ferrers; Ringmore and Ugborough.

== See also ==
- List of hundreds of England and Wales - Devon
