= Coleridge Hundred =

Ancient administrative unit of Devon, England

The hundred of Coleridge was the name of one of thirty-two ancient administrative units of Devon, England.

The parishes in the hundred were: Ashprington, Blackawton, Buckland-Tout-Saints, Charleton, Chivelstone, Cornworthy, Dartmouth St Petrox, Dartmouth St Saviour, Dartmouth Townstall, Dittisham, Dodbrooke, East Portlemouth, Halwell, Harberton, Sherford, Slapton, South Pool, Stoke Fleming, Stokenham, and Totnes.

== See also ==
- List of hundreds of England and Wales - Devon
