= Bowden, Stoke Fleming =

Hamlet in Devon, England

Coordinates: 50.32°N 03.63°W

Bowden
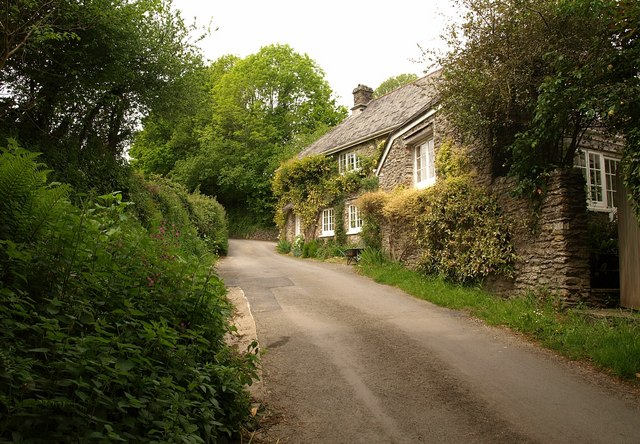
- A cottage at Bowden

- Location within Devon
- OS grid reference: SX8448
- Shire county: Devon
- Region: South West
- Country: England
- Sovereign state: United Kingdom
- Police: Devon and Cornwall
- Fire: Devon and Somerset
- Ambulance: South Western

Bowden is a hamlet in the parish of Stoke Fleming in the South Hams district of Devon, England, about 1 mile (2 km) west of Stoke Fleming. Bowden House was the seat of the Netherton family from about 1750.
