= Ash, Devon =

Village in Devon, England

Coordinates: 50.32°N 03.64°W

Ash
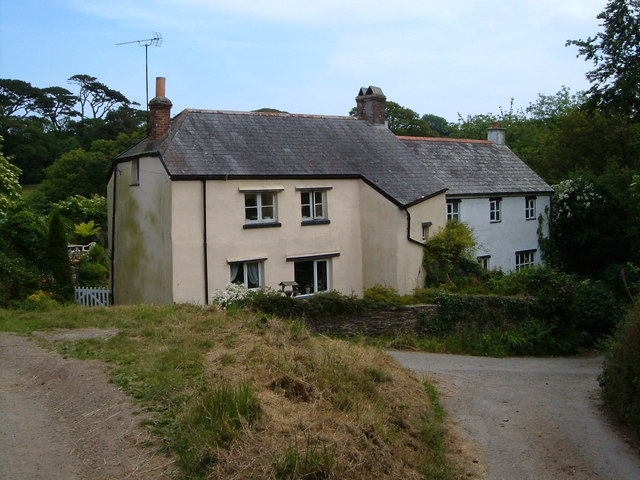
- Cottages at Lower Ash

- Location within Devon
- OS grid reference: SX8349
- Civil parish: Stoke Fleming
- District: South Hams
- Shire county: Devon
- Region: South West
- Country: England
- Sovereign state: United Kingdom
- Police: Devon and Cornwall
- Fire: Devon and Somerset
- Ambulance: South Western

Ash is a hamlet in the civil parish of Stoke Fleming, in the South Hams district, in Devon, England and is situated approximately 2.5 miles (4 km) south-west of Dartmouth.
