= Wotter =

Village in Devon, England

Coordinates: 50.438°N 04.032°W

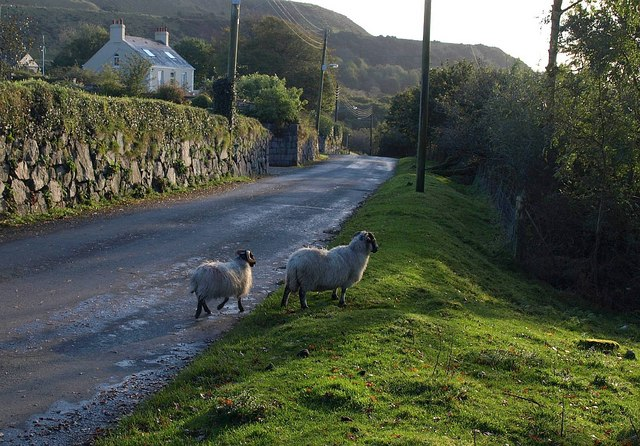
- The road through the village

- Location within Devon
- OS grid reference: SX5561
- District: South Hams
- Shire county: Devon
- Region: South West
- Country: England
- Sovereign state: United Kingdom
- Post town: PLYMOUTH
- Postcode district: PL7
- Dialling code: 01752
- Police: Devon and Cornwall
- Fire: Devon and Somerset
- Ambulance: South Western
- UK Parliament: South West Devon

Wotter is a village near Shaugh Prior on the south western edge of Dartmoor, in the English county of Devon. The village was founded in 1906: previously, there had only been a farm and two houses between Shaugh Prior and Lee Moor.

== Local amenities ==
Wotter has a GP surgery, which is part of the Ridgeway Practice. This practice, the largest in South & West Devon, also has surgeries in Plympton and Chaddlewood. The surgery at Wotter has one GP and a dispenser and is open two days a week.

As there is no school in the village itself, young children generally attend Shaugh Prior Primary School, which serves the settlements of Shaugh Prior, Wotter and Lee Moor.

Wotter also has a hotel (The Moorland Hotel), chapel and hall, and play area. The church hall houses a part-time Post Office service, which began operating there a few months after the village's post office closed in 2004. It is also used for Shaugh Prior Parish Council meetings. The chapel was founded as a Methodist church in 1939, sharing a minister with those at Woodford and Compton. After the church closed, it was bought by a Christian family and reopened as Wotter Community Chapel.

The Plymouth Citybus Service 59 travels via Wotter, giving access to and from Plymouth City Centre, as well as the nearby villages of Shaugh Prior, Bickleigh, Cornwood, Lutton and Sparkwell. On Mondays, Citybus also operate a free bus service between Wotter and the Tesco Extra store at Lee Mill.

== Government ==
Wotter is part of the civil parish of Shaugh Prior, within the Bickleigh and Shaugh ward of South Hams District Council.

== Notable incidents ==
In January 2010, thirteen homes in the village had to be evacuated for more than 24 hours following a fire in a hay barn at Higher Bughill Farm. The barn was thought to contain a large quantity of ammonium nitrate-based fertiliser and other chemicals, which posed a risk of explosion as well as the possibility of the smoke containing poisonous fumes. This chemical danger initially caused the Environment Agency to also issue a warning about water quality in the River Plym, but they later concluded the river was unaffected.
