= Bittaford =

Village in Devon, England

Coordinates: 50.397086°N 3.8767166°W

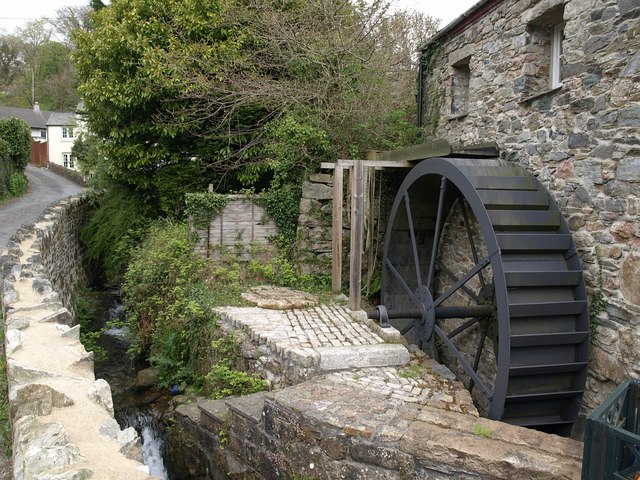

- Location within Devon
- Area: 0.412 km^{2} (0.159 sq mi)
- Population: 855 (2018 estimate)
  - Density: 2,075/km^{2} (5,370/sq mi)
- Civil parish: Ugborough
- District: South Hams
- Shire county: Devon
- Region: South West
- Country: England
- Sovereign state: United Kingdom
- Police: Devon and Cornwall
- Fire: Devon and Somerset
- Ambulance: South Western

Bittaford is a village about a mile from Ugborough village, in the civil parish of Ugborough, in the South Hams district, in the county of Devon, England. In 2018 it had an estimated population of 855. The village is divided into 2 parts by a railway viaduct.

== Amenities ==
Bittaford has a community hall, a Methodist church on Exeter Road and a pub called the Horse and Groom on Exeter Road.
