= Buckland-Tout-Saints =

Village in Devon, England

Coordinates: 50°18′06″N 3°44′26″W

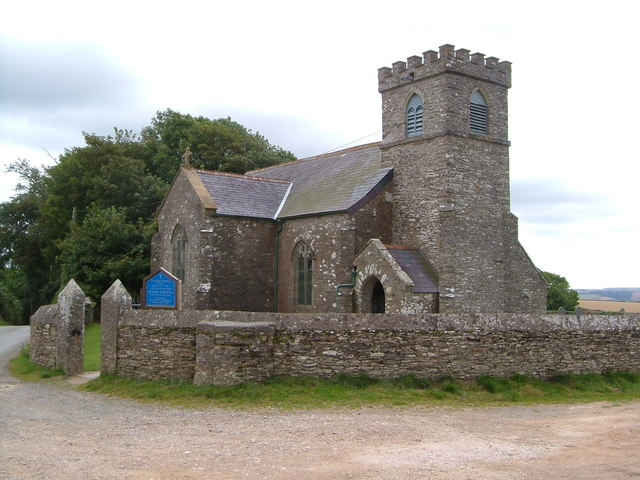
- St Peter's church, Buckland-Tout-Saints

- Location within Devon
- Population: 178 (2001 census)
- Civil parish: Buckland-Tout-Saints
- District: South Hams
- Shire county: Devon
- Region: South West
- Country: England
- Sovereign state: United Kingdom
- Post town: KINGSBRIDGE
- Postcode district: TQ7
- Dialling code: 01548

Buckland-Tout-Saints is a village and civil parish in the South Hams district of Devon, England. In the 2001 census it had a population of 178, up from a population of only 37 in 1901. The parish also includes the hamlets of Bearscombe, Goveton and Ledstone. The parish is surrounded clockwise from the north by the parishes of Woodleigh, East Allington, Frogmore and Sherford, Kingsbridge, Churchstow, and a short boundary with Loddiswell.

The name derives from the Toutsaints family who held the manor here in the 13th century.

== Manor House ==
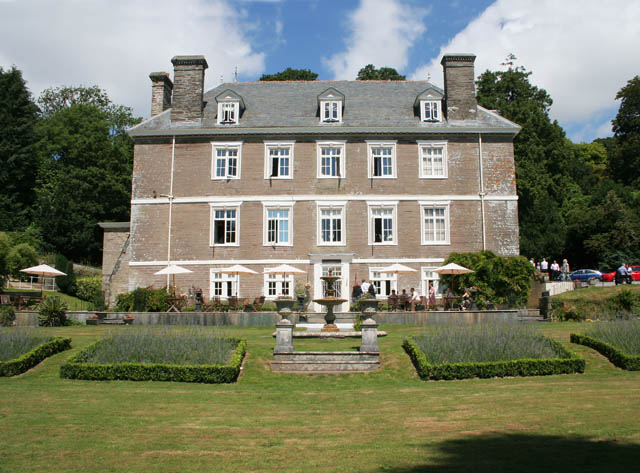
Buckland-Tout-Saints Manor.

The manor was original the design of the Toutsaints family in the 13th century. They continued to be Lord of the manor until the 16th century, when the manor was sold to the Southcott family in 1587. In 1600 the family built the current house that stands on the site, naming it Buckland House. The house was further extended by John Henry Southcote JP Esq of Buckland, he later donated large sums of money to the nearby church, St. Peter's. Upon John's death in 1793 the estate, of 1,200 acres, was sold to William Clark, a wealthy brewer and businessman. The house is now used commercially as a luxury hotel.
