= Cott Inn =

Medieval inn in Devon, England

Coordinates: 50.4424°N 3.7085°W

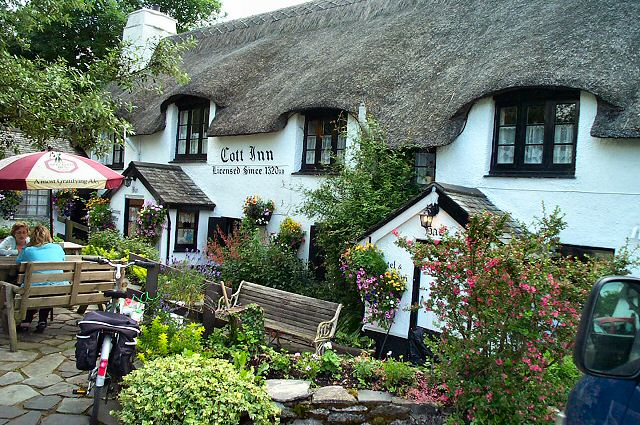
Cott Inn - Dartington - geograph.org.uk - 22571

The Cott Inn is a medieval inn at Dartington, Devon, in the southwest of England. Founded in 1307, it is the second oldest inn in Britain, and a listed building.

== History ==
The Cott Inn was founded in 1307 while the Fitz Martin family held the manor of Dartington, making it the second-oldest inn in Britain. It is named for the merchant Johannes Cott, like the local hamlet of Cott. The inn served travellers, including those carrying wool or tin, on the packhorse road between Ashburton and Totnes.

The inn's medieval walls are made of stone rubble and "perhaps some cob" (subsoil mixed with straw), rendered and painted white. It has a thatched roof, supposedly the longest such roof in Britain. Thick closely-spaced rough-hewn wooden cross-beams support the low ceilings. The rooms have inglenook fireplaces. Its original plan was of three rooms with a through passage, with chimney-stacks in the gables at both ends; if there was an open central hall, it has left no trace. The room at the higher end has a stone newel staircase beside the chimney-stack. The building was remodelled, probably late in the 17th century, and extended in the 18th century. The upper windows are 19th or 20th century; some of them break the line of eaves with "eyebrows in the thatch". The lower windows are older 4-lights. The roof is supported on "principals" (timbers) with "straight feet" bedded into the tops of the front and back walls.

It is a Grade II listed building; it was added to the list in 1952.

== Reception ==
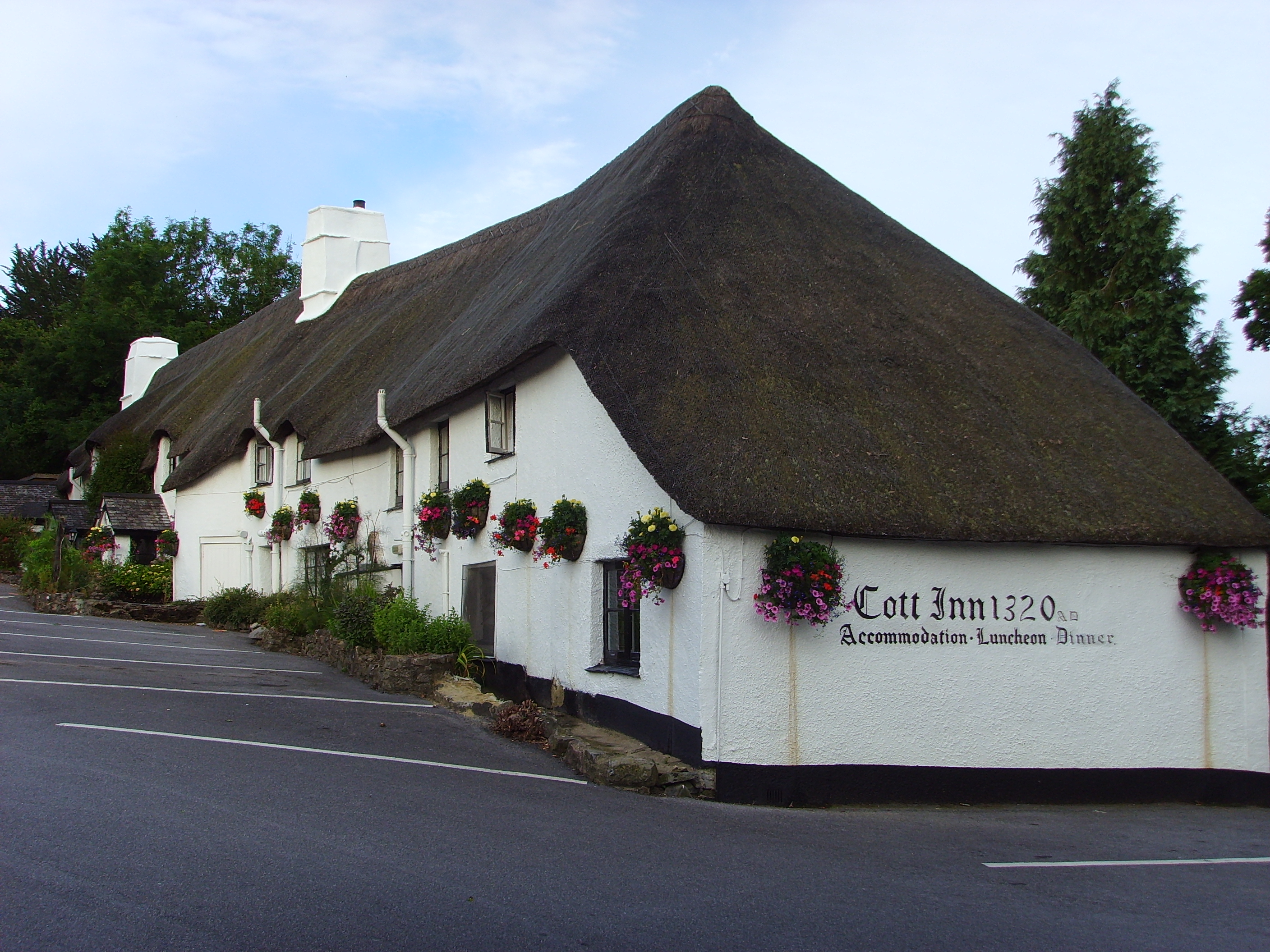
The Cott Inn's thatched roof is said to be the longest in Britain.

Gemma Bowes and colleagues in The Guardian described it as "a homely family-run pub...a cosy choice for winter, and with live music in the bar on Wednesday and Sunday nights the atmosphere can be crackling." They described the five bedrooms as "bright, modern, and comfortable". Anna Turns, reviewing the inn for The Daily Telegraph, wrote that the rooms had "much more personality than any run-of-the-mill chain-pub accommodation", while the made-to-order dishes were "not speedy pub grub but worth the wait". In her view, "this charming historic Devonshire gastropub has a great seasonal menu, heaps of character and a lively and welcoming atmosphere." Patrick McCaig, reviewing the inn for DevonLife, calls it friendly and well run. Visit Totnes calls it a "stunning 14th century thatched pub ... with cosy log fires" for the winter and a "large pretty garden" and delicious food from the "alfresco kitchen" for the summer. Lonely Planet states that "The 14th-century Cott is pretty much the perfect English inn: rambling, thatched and lined with beams."

== Awards ==
In 2016, the Cott Inn was 8th in The Daily Telegraph's list of "30 Best Pubs in Britain".

In 2019, it was named "Great British Pub of the Year".

Also in 2019, The Guardian listed the Cott Inn among its "40 great cosy hotels, B&Bs and pubs with rooms for winter".
