= A379 road =

Road in Devon, England

A379

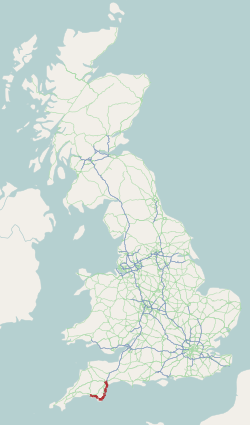

Route information
- Length: 69 mi (111 km)

Major junctions
- Northeast end: Exeter; 50.7126°N 3.4654°W; 50.6733°N 3.5355°W
- M5; A38 A3015 A381 A3022 A3122 A3121 A374
- Southwest end: Plymouth; 50.3702°N 4.1243°W

Location
- Country: United Kingdom
- Constituent country: England

Road network
- Roads in the United Kingdom; Motorways; A and B road zones

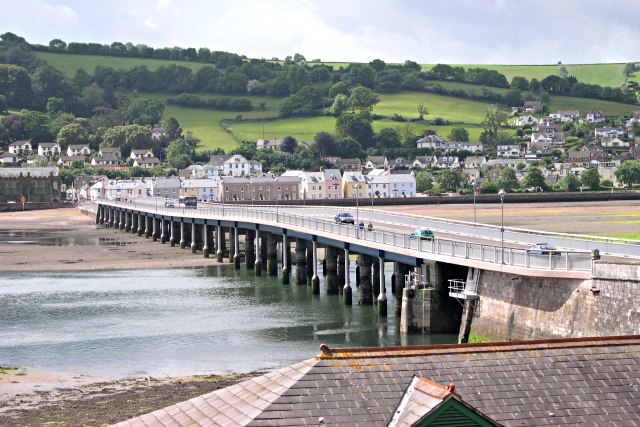
The Shaldon Bridge

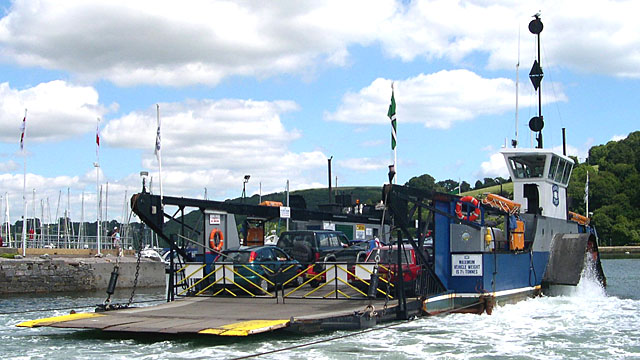
The Dartmouth Higher Ferry

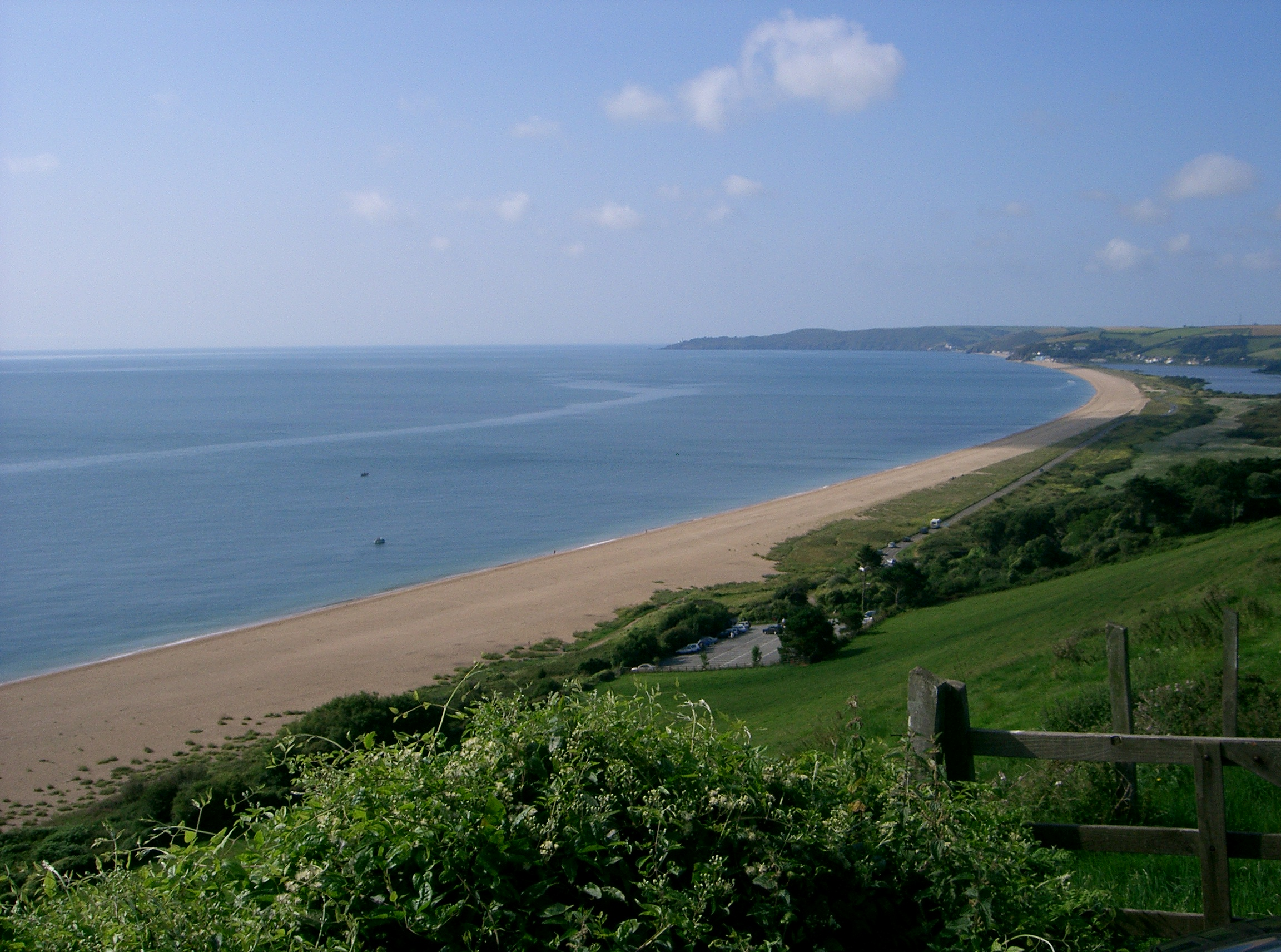
The A379 on Slapton Sands

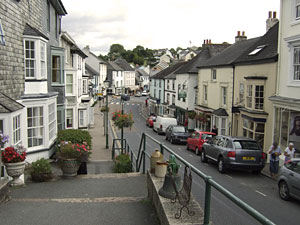
The A379 (Church Street) in Modbury

The A379 is a road in the English county of Devon. It links points on the edges of that county's two principal cities, Exeter and Plymouth, by an indirect and largely coastal route. The A38 provides a faster and more direct inland route between Exeter and Plymouth, whilst the A380 provides a similarly faster route between Exeter and the Torbay area. However the A379 serves many small coastal communities and ports along the coast. The indented nature of the South Devon coast means that the road is usually out of sight of the sea, but the many rivers and estuaries are crossed by bridges and, in one case, a cable ferry.

Parts of the stretch of road between Slapton and Torcross were destroyed by Storm Chandra in February 2026 after flood defences were damaged by previous storms. According to the area's MP Caroline Voaden, the road is expected to remain closed until "at least" early 2027.

== Route ==
At its northeastern end, the A379 has two branches and two starting points. One branch starts with a junction with the M5 motorway at Clyst St Mary (J30), whilst the other branch starts with a junction with the A38 at Kennford. Both these branches were historically part of the A38, and the first crosses the Countess Wear bridges over the River Exe and the Exeter Canal, once infamous for the delays caused on what was then the principal route to the holiday resorts of Devon and Cornwall.

From the junction of the two branches, some 3 miles (4.8 km) south of Exeter city centre, the A379 heads south parallel to the estuary of the River Exe. At Starcross the road runs close alongside both the Exeter to Plymouth railway line and the estuary, and the Exmouth to Starcross passenger ferry provides a connection to Exmouth on the other side of the estuary. Beyond Starcross, the road continues through the coastal resorts of Dawlish and Teignmouth. From 1991 to 1997, there was a break in the road when the section of A379 between Dawlish and Torquay was downgraded to the B3199. The only remaining roadsign indicating this is a wrong direction facing B3199 sign on a lamppost in Teignmouth Hill, Dawlish.

Leaving Teignmouth, the A379 crosses the estuary of the River Teign on the historic Shaldon Bridge. The road then continues into the large resort of Torquay, where it meets the A3022 road. The two road designations share the same physical road through the Torbay area, although only the A3022 is signed. At Paignton the two roads diverge, and the A379 follows a route through Goodrington before briefly rejoining the A3022 at Churston.

From Churston, the A379 bypasses Kingswear before crossing the Paignton and Dartmouth Steam Railway on a level crossing and reaching the Dartmouth Higher Ferry on the banks of the River Dart. This tolled vehicular ferry carries the road across the river and into the picturesque harbour town of Dartmouth. From here the A379 continues via Stoke Fleming and then along the coast at Slapton. Here the road runs behind the beach, between the sea and the Slapton Ley lagoon. Turning inland, it then proceeds to the town of Kingsbridge at the head of the Kingsbridge Estuary.

From Kingsbridge, the A379 passes through the villages of Aveton Gifford, where it crosses the River Avon, and Modbury, shortly after which it crosses the River Erme. The villages of Yealmpton, on the River Yealm, and Brixton follow. The road then runs into the suburbs of Plymouth, bypassing Plymstock before crossing the estuary of the River Plym on the Laira Bridge. The A379 ends on the west side of the Plym, joining the A374 just over 1 mile (1.6 km) east of Plymouth city centre.

== Trafficability ==
Apart from short stretches of dual carriageway at either end and in Torquay, the A379 is a single carriageway road, and is often narrow and twisting. Like all roads in England of any significance, it is sealed throughout.

The A379 crosses the River Dart using the Higher Ferry, a car ferry that until 2009 had a capacity of just 18 cars, which caused congestion at busy times. A new ferryboat with a capacity of 32 cars came into service in June 2009. The alternative Lower Ferry can also be used, although this involves negotiating the narrow streets of Kingswear village.

== See also ==
- A roads in Zone 3 of the Great Britain numbering scheme
