= Churchstow =

Village in Devon, England

Coordinates: 50.299°N 3.809°W

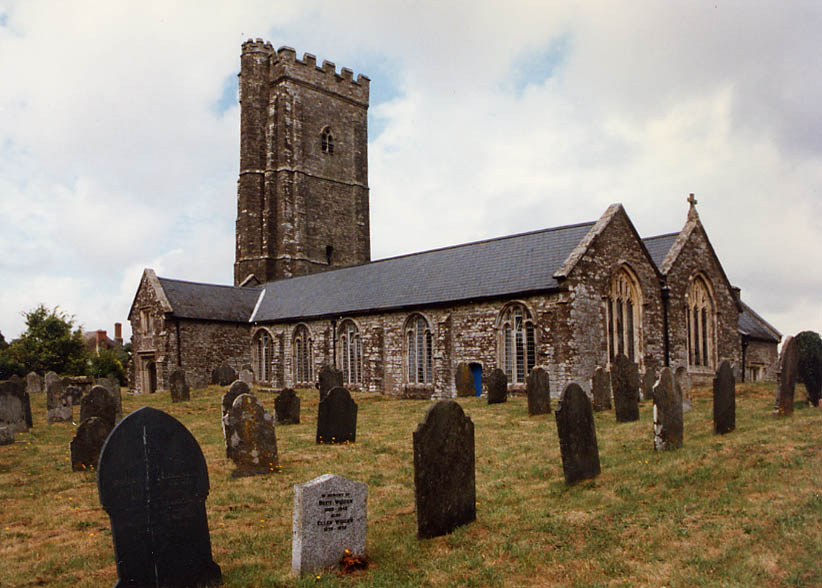
- St Mary's Church, Churchstow

- Location within Devon
- Area: 10.5 km^{2} (4.1 sq mi)
- Population: 465 (2011 UK Census)
  - Density: 44/km^{2} (110/sq mi)
- OS grid reference: SX712458
  - London: 182 miles (293 km) ENE
- Civil parish: Churchstow
- District: South Hams
- Shire county: Devon
- Region: South West
- Country: England
- Sovereign state: United Kingdom
- Post town: Kingsbridge
- Postcode district: TQ7
- Dialling code: 01548
- Police: Devon and Cornwall
- Fire: Devon and Somerset
- Ambulance: South Western
- UK Parliament: Totnes
- Website: http://www.churchstow-devon.co.uk/history.html

Churchstow is a village and civil parish situated on the A379 road in the South Hams district in south Devon, England. It is situated 1.9 miles (3 km) north-west of Kingsbridge and 16 miles (26 km) south-east of Plymouth. The parish had a population of 465 in 2011, according to the 2011 UK Census.

== Etymology and history ==
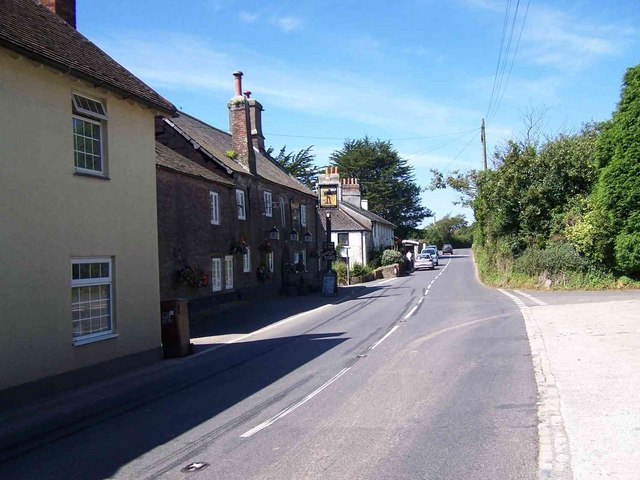
A379 through Churchstow

The local church, St Mary's is 14th century and is a fine example of churches built during this time in the South Hams district. The building is made using local dark slate. It is a Grade II* listed building. As the church is situated atop a high ridge, the village was thereafter named "Church-stow". In 1220, Churchstow was the parent town of Kingsbridge.

The village has one public house, the Church House Inn. Built in the 17th century, the building is made from green slate. It is a distributor of beverages from the St Austell Brewery and is a recognised Cask Marque public house.

Nearby villages include Thurlestone, Aveton Gifford and Loddiswell.
