= Dean Prior =

Village in Devon, England

Coordinates: 50°27′27″N 3°47′27″W

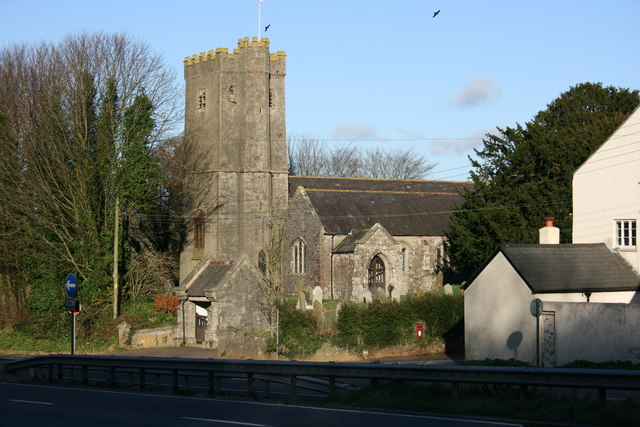
- Dean Prior church

- Location within Devon
- Population: 201 (2011 census)
- Civil parish: Dean Prior
- District: South Hams
- Shire county: Devon
- Region: South West
- Country: England
- Sovereign state: United Kingdom
- Post town: Buckfastleigh
- Postcode district: TQ11
- Police: Devon and Cornwall
- Fire: Devon and Somerset
- Ambulance: South Western

Dean Prior is a village and civil parish near the A38 road, in the South Hams district, in the county of Devon, England. It is located near the town of Buckfastleigh and north of South Brent.

In the 1870s, Dean Prior was described as "a parish in Totnes district, Devon; on the verge of Dartmoor, near the river Dart, 3 miles N of Brent r. station, and 6 NW of Totnes." According to the 2011 census, there were 94 males and 107 females living in the parish; a total population of 201 people.

Traditionally, Dean Prior's population was predominantly working in agriculture, trade or manufacturing; reflected by the 1801 census that divided its population into these three categories. This was contrasted by the census of 1841 which did not divide the population into these groups and instead focused on occupational data and social status. The first census to report on how well people were housed was that of 1891, but the only statistics gathered were on the number of rooms and the number of people in each household. We know of no constituencies that were named after Dean Prior; where constituencies had more than one name, we base this on their "preferred" name.

Dean Prior's population has gradually risen based on the census, with a fairly even, but slightly male-dominated population. Its greatest infant mortality rate was recorded to be at 150 per 1000 in 1860 (today it is recorded at two). There has always been a heavy agricultural presence in the parish of Dean Prior, as well as consumer services and manufacturing. However, contemporary statistics state that the area is now much more service-based, e.g. business, consumer and public. Traditionally the unemployment rate has stayed low but the percentage of people with university degrees or equivalent has risen to 35 (2010). Living conditions have also massively improved over the years. Industrial Britain meant that overcrowding in housing was common, however as Britain has developed this is no longer a problem; this is echoed in Dean Prior.

== St George the Martyr Church ==
Dean Prior has a Grade I listed church dedicated to St George the Martyr, where the seventeenth-century poet Robert Herrick was vicar from 1629 to 1646 and 1660 to 1674.

A gothic church, built in the late thirteenth or early fourteenth century, it is made of stone rubble with granite dressings. The church is home to a twelfth-century romanesque style font, decorated around the rim with saltires and highly stylised forms, described by Nikolaus Pevsner as being dragons, although Michael Paraskos claims they are examples of pseudo-Arabic writing.

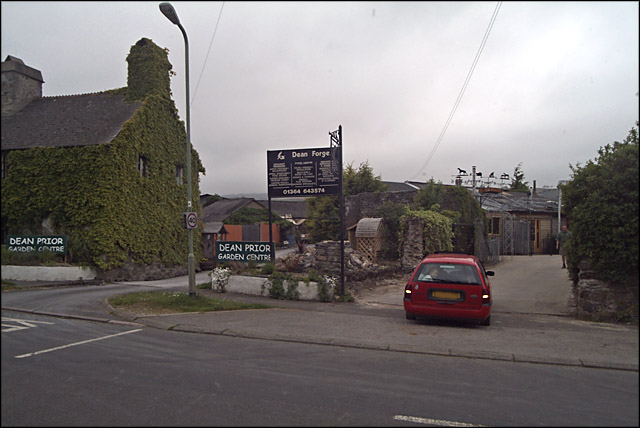
Dean Forge and Dean Prior Garden Centre

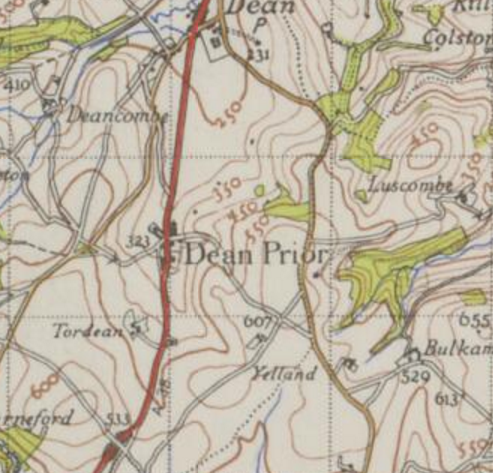
Ordnance Survey map showing Dean Prior

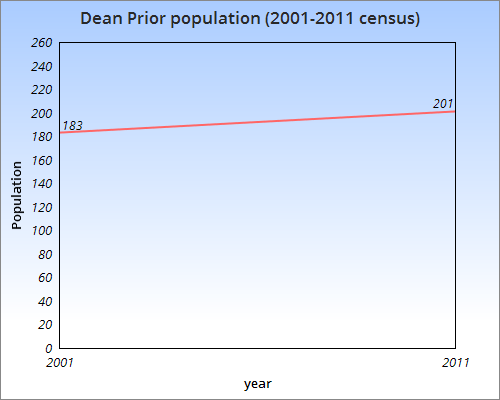
Dean Prior parish population, 2001–2011
