= Harford, Devon =

Hamlet in Devon, England

Coordinates: 50.418787°N 3.918504°W

Harford
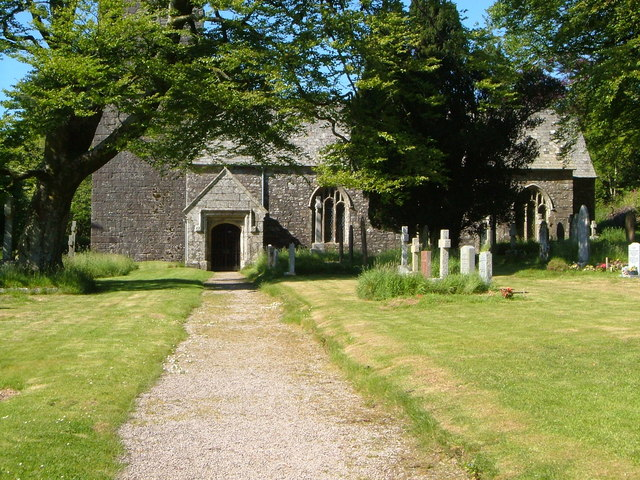
- St Petroc's Church: the parish church

- Location within Devon
- Population: 77 (2001)
- OS grid reference: SX63835946
  - London: 181 mi (291 km)
- Civil parish: Harford
- District: South Hams
- Shire county: Devon
- Region: South West
- Country: England
- Sovereign state: United Kingdom
- Post town: IVYBRIDGE
- Postcode district: PL21
- Dialling code: 01548
- Police: Devon and Cornwall
- Fire: Devon and Somerset
- Ambulance: South Western
- UK Parliament: South West Devon
- Website: Community page website

Harford is a hamlet and civil parish located approximately 2 miles (3.2 km) north of the town of Ivybridge in the county of Devon, England. The parish lies in the local government district of the South Hams, which is a localised, second-tier governmental division of the non-metropolitan county of Devon, administered by Devon County Council.

With a parish population of just 77 people, it is the smallest civil parish in the South Hams by number of people. Part of the village (now town) of Ivybridge — the district's largest civil parish with 12,056 people — used to lye in the parish boundaries of Harford, until the parish of St John's was formed in 1836 (later renamed the parish of Ivybridge in 1894).

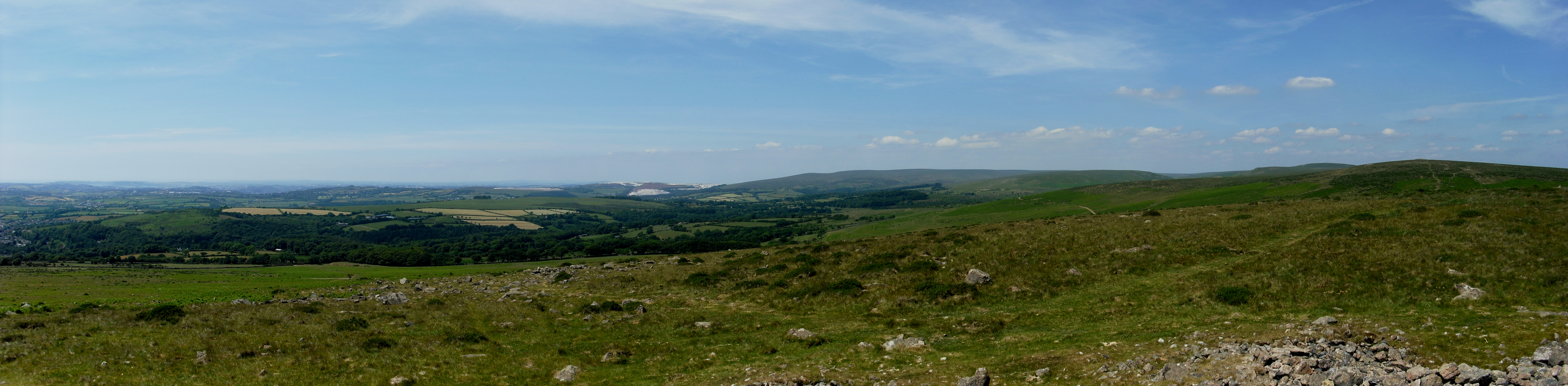
Panoramic view of parts of the Harford parish area as seen from Western Beacon, Dartmoor
