= Blackawton =

Village in Devon, England

Coordinates: 50.345820°N 3.681350°W

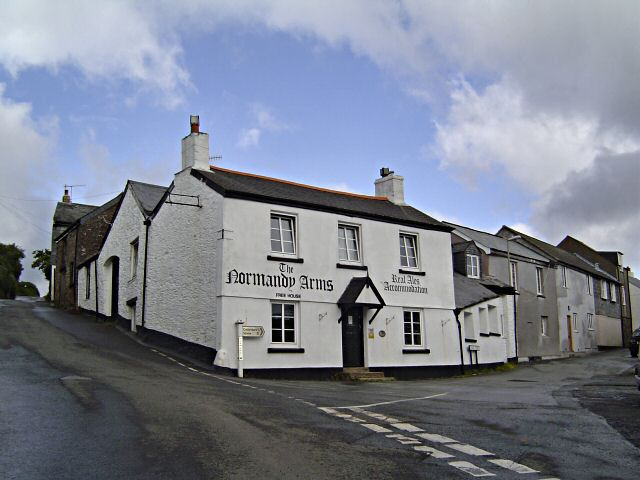
- The Normandy Arms, Blackawton which has since closed.

- Location within Devon
- Population: 647 (2001 census)
- District: South Hams
- Shire county: Devon
- Region: South West
- Country: England
- Sovereign state: United Kingdom
- Postcode district: TQ9
- UK Parliament: Totnes

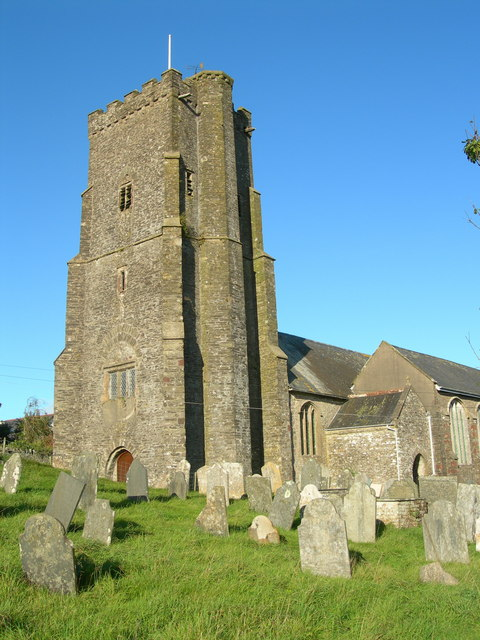
Parish church of St Michael

Blackawton is a village and civil parish in the South Hams district of Devon, England. According to the 2001 census, it had a population of 647. Blackawton is a major part of the West Dart electoral ward. The ward's population at the 2011 census was 1,946. The village is about six miles west of Dartmouth.

The church is 15th century, with a Norman baptismal font and a well-preserved rood screen.

Blackawton has hosted an annual worm charming competition since 1984.

There is one pub in Blackawton, The George Inn. A second pub, The Normandy Arms, has since closed.

The village runs its own village shop and post office, all run by volunteers.

In 2010 a study of bumblebee behaviour by pupils from Blackawton Primary School was accepted for publication in the Royal Society's Biology Letters journal.
