= Charleton =

Civil parish in Devon, England

Coordinates: 50°16′13″N 3°44′31″W

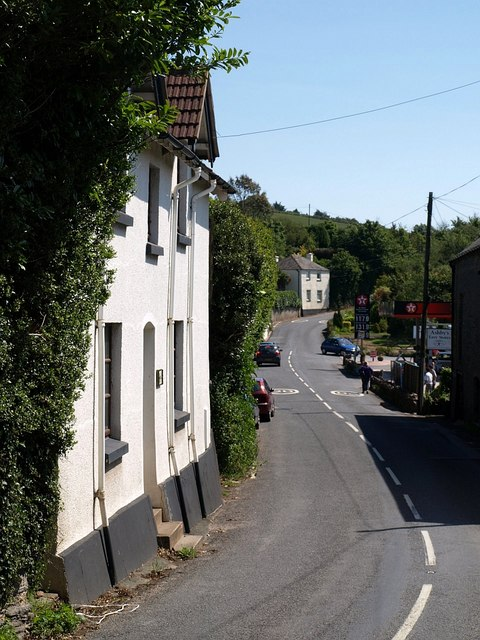
- The road through East Charleton village

- Location within Devon
- Population: 511 (2001 census)
- Civil parish: Charleton
- District: South Hams
- Shire county: Devon
- Region: South West
- Country: England
- Sovereign state: United Kingdom

Charleton is a civil parish in the South Hams district, in the county of Devon, England. In 2001 its population was 511. The parish forms part of the Saltstone electoral ward. At the 2011 census the ward had a population of 1,529.

Its main settlements are East Charleton (a small village) and West Charleton which has the parish church of St Mary's, (the latter being the larger of the two villages).
