= Diptford =

Village in Devon, England

Coordinates: 50.394516°N 3.795137°W

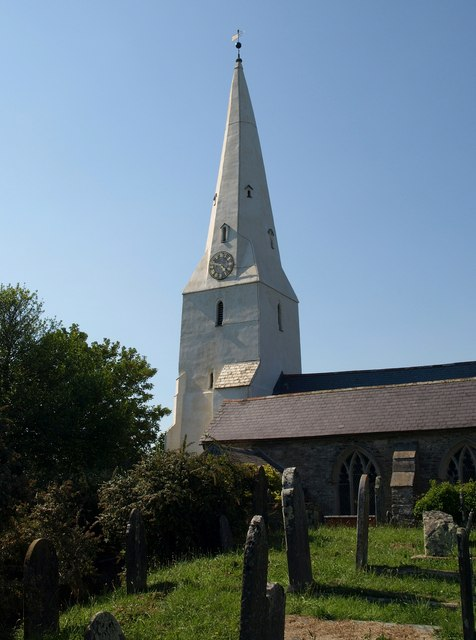
- St Mary's church, Diptford

- Location within Devon
- Population: 612 (2021 census)
- OS grid reference: SX7256
- Civil parish: Diptford
- District: South Hams
- Shire county: Devon
- Region: South West
- Country: England
- Sovereign state: United Kingdom
- Police: Devon and Cornwall
- Fire: Devon and Somerset
- Ambulance: South Western

Diptford is a village and civil parish in the South Hams district, in the county of Devon, England. It is perched on a hill overlooking the River Avon. The name is believed to come from "deep ford", referring to the local site of a river crossing. In 2021 the parish had a population of 612. The village is mentioned in the Domesday Book as one of the settlements in the Hundred of Diptford.

At the centre of the village is a small primary school, the parish hall and the recently redeveloped 14th-century church. A former rector of the village, Rev. William Gregor, discovered the element titanium, which he called manaccanite, in 1791.

The Scottish writer John Keir Cross lived in the village and died there in 1967.

The Dipford Cross and wall were rebuilt on 23 August 2020, by Aldridge born Craftsman and artist John Clifton.
