= South Hams =

Local government district in Devon, England

- Non-metropolitan district
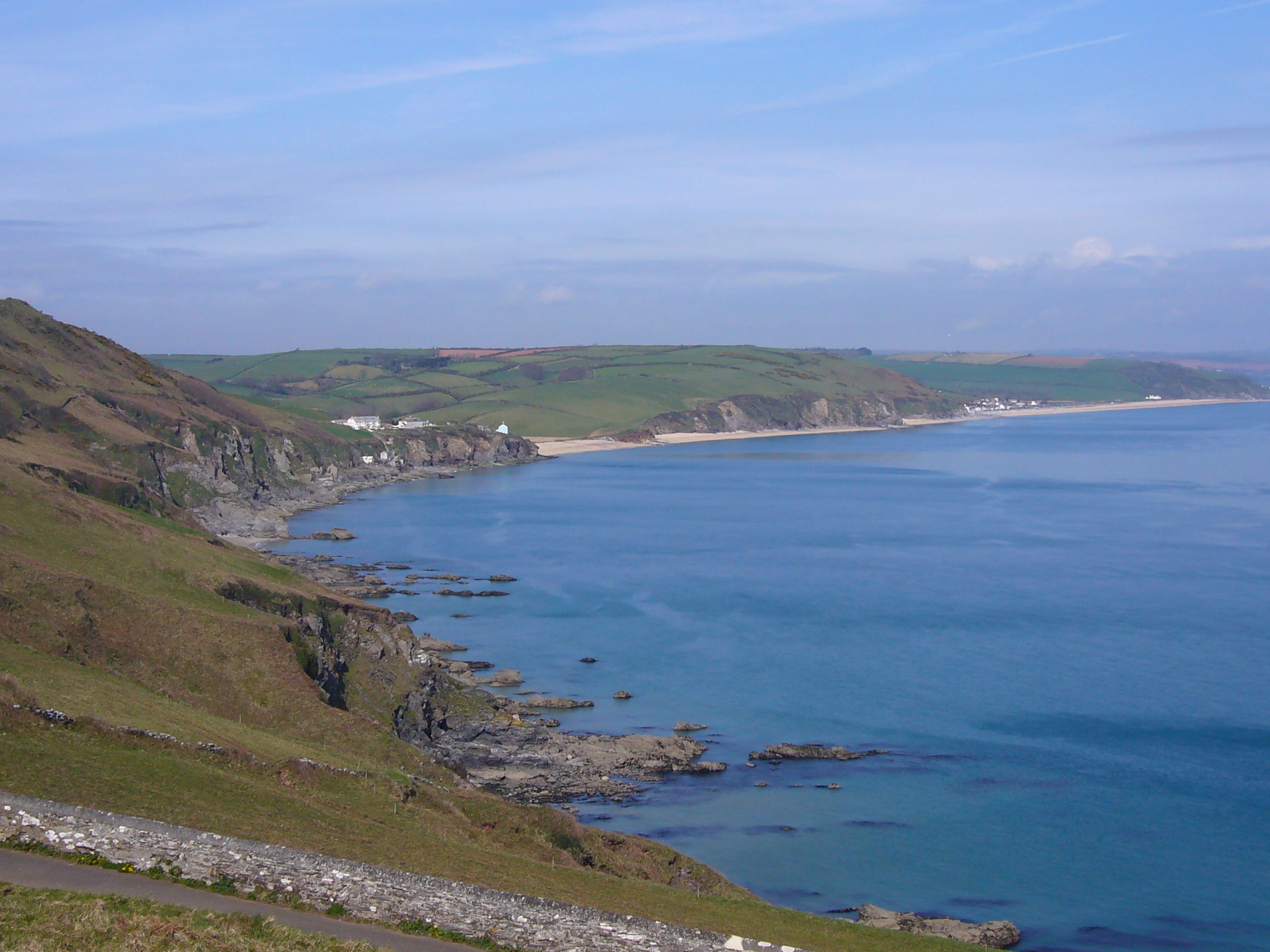
- From Start Point looking towards Hallsands and Beesands

- South Hams shown within Devon
- Coordinates (Totnes): 50°25′53″N 3°41′28″W
- Sovereign state: United Kingdom
- Constituent country: England
- Region: South West England
- Non-metropolitan county: Devon
- Formed: 1 April 1974

Government
  - Type: District council
  - Body: South Hams District Council
  - HQ: Totnes
  - Sub-divisions: Civil parishes
  - UK Parliament: South West Devon; South Devon
  - MPs: Rebecca Smith (C); Caroline Voaden (LD)

Area
  - Total: 342.28 sq mi (886.51 km^{2})
  - Rank: Ranked 36th

Population (2024)
  - Total: 92,148
  - Rank: Ranked 262nd
  - Density: 270/sq mi (104/km^{2})
  - Ethnicity: 97.5% White (94.2% White British): 97.04% White British; 0.47% White Irish; 1.57% Other White; 0.13% Asian; 0.06% Indian; 0.02% Pakistani; 0.02% Bangladeshi; 0.03% Other Asian; 0.12% Black; 0.05% Black Caribbean; 0.04% Black African; 0.03% Other Black; 0.49% Mixed; 0.10% White & Black Caribbean; 0.05% White & Black African; 0.16% White & South Asian; 0.18% White & Other; 0.17% East Asian and Other; 0.07% Chinese; 0.10% Other
- ONS code: 18UG

South Hams is a local government district on the south coast of Devon, England. Its council is based in the town of Totnes, although the largest town is Ivybridge. The district also contains the towns of Dartmouth, Kingsbridge and Salcombe and numerous villages and surrounding rural areas.

Much of the district's landscape is recognised for its natural beauty; the north of the district includes part of Dartmoor National Park, the district's coastline and adjoining areas form most of the South Devon Area of Outstanding Natural Beauty, and part of the west of the district lies within the Tamar Valley AONB. The district's coast includes the promontories of Start Point and Bolt Head.

The neighbouring districts are Torbay, Teignbridge, West Devon, Cornwall (across the Tamar–Tavy Estuary) and Plymouth.

== Toponymy ==
"Ham" is an Old English term which can mean a homestead, river meadow or peninsula. The settled farming areas either side of the largely uninhabited wilderness of Dartmoor were anciently termed the "North Hams" and "South Hams" respectively. The name North Hams fell out of general usage, but the name South Hams continued to be used for the area between Dartmoor and the south coast.

== History ==
The South Hams were formerly part of the Brythonic (Celtic) Kingdom of Dumnonia. Post-Roman settlement on coastal promontory hillforts, such as Burgh Island, followed the established pattern of trading (particularly of tin) found across the western Atlantic coastal regions. The Anglo-Saxon conquest of south Devon was completed in the late 7th and early 8th centuries. In the later Anglo-Saxon era, the South Hams was a feudal estate consisting of all of the land between the River Plym and River Dart and south of Dartmoor with the English Channel forming the southern boundary. As a result of claims made by 19th century antiquarian Richard Polwhele, there is a popular belief that Cornish continued to be spoken in the area until the later middle ages and as late as the 14th century. However, there is, in fact, no evidence supporting this.

In 1917, the village of Hallsands was abandoned after much of it was lost to the sea following the removal of the shingle bank protecting the shore to help build Devonport dockyard.

In 1944 several villages were evacuated so that training for D-Day could be carried out in secret. The area was chosen because of the resemblance of its beaches to those of Normandy. Preparations were disrupted, and secrecy nearly compromised, by a devastating E-boat attack during Exercise Tiger.

The modern local government district was formed on 1 April 1974 under the Local Government Act 1972, covering the area of seven former districts which were all abolished at the same time:

- Dartmouth Municipal Borough (Note: Formally called "Clifton Dartmouth Hardness".)
- Kingsbridge Rural District
- Kingsbridge Urban District
- Plympton St Mary Rural District
- Salcombe Urban District
- Totnes Municipal Borough
- Totnes Rural District

The new district was named South Hams, using the long-established name for the area.

In July 2026, it was announced that South Hams District Council would be abolished as part of the nationwide Local Government Reorganisation programme aiming to replace two-tier governance with unitary authorities. Parishes near Plymouth will be incorporated into an expanded Plymouth unitary authority; parishes near Torbay will be incorporated into an expanded Torbay unitary authority; remaining parishes will be incorporated into a new Devon Coast and Countryside unitary authority. The changes are planned to come into full effect as of 2028.

== Governance ==
South Hams District Council

Type
- Type: Non-metropolitan district council

History
- Founded: 1 April 1974

Leadership
- Chair: Jacqi Hodgson, Green since 14 May 2026
- Leader: Dan Thomas, Liberal Democrat since 15 May 2025
- Chief Executive: Andy Bates since June 2020

Structure
- Seats: 31 councillors
- Political groups: Administration (19) Liberal Democrats (19) Opposition (12) Conservative (7) Green (3) Labour (1) Independent (1)

Elections
- Voting system: Plurality-at-large
- Last election: 4 May 2023

Meeting place
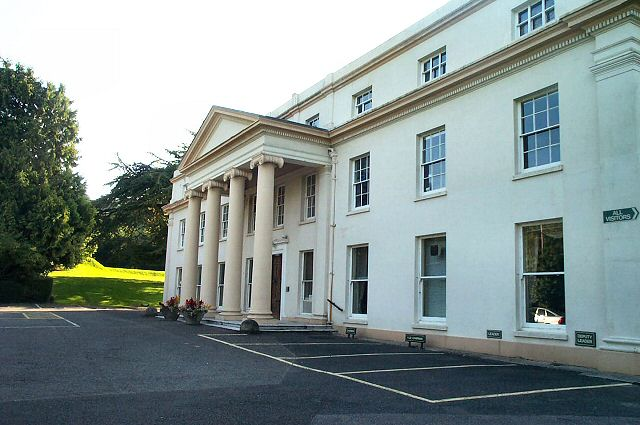
- Follaton House, Plymouth Road, Totnes, TQ9 5NE

Website
- www.southhams.gov.uk

Constitution
- South Hams District Council Constitution

South Hams District Council provides district-level services. County-level services are provided by Devon County Council. The whole district is also covered by civil parishes, which form a third tier of local government.

In the parts of the district within the Dartmoor National Park, town planning is the responsibility of the Dartmoor National Park Authority. The district council appoints one of its councillors to serve on the 19-person National Park Authority.

=== Political control ===
The council has been under Liberal Democrat majority control since the 2023 election.

The first election to the council was held in 1973, initially operating as a shadow authority alongside the outgoing authorities until the new arrangements came into effect on 1 April 1974. Political control of the council since 1974 has been as follows:

Party in control	Years
Independent	1974–1983
No overall control	1983–1987
Conservative	1987–1995
No overall control	1995–1999
Conservative	1999–2023
Liberal Democrats	2023–present

=== Leadership ===
The leaders of the council since 1994 have been:

Councillor	Party	From	To
Owen Masters	Conservative	1994	May 1995
Doreen Flood	Liberal Democrats	May 1995	May 1999
Owen Masters	Conservative	May 1999	2001
Richard Yonge	Conservative	2001	2007
John Tucker	Conservative	2007	May 2019
Judy Pearce	Conservative	16 May 2019	May 2023
Julian Brazil	Liberal Democrats	25 May 2023	15 May 2025
Dan Thomas	Liberal Democrats	15 May 2025	

=== Composition ===
Following the 2023 election, the composition of the council was:

Party	Councillors
Liberal Democrats	19
Conservative	7
Green	3
Labour	1
Independent	1
Total	31

=== Premises ===
The council is based at Follaton House, a large converted house on the outskirts of Totnes. The main house dates back to the early nineteenth century and is a Grade II* listed building. The building had been bought by the old Totnes Rural District Council for £26,000 in 1965 and converted to become its offices, transferring to the new South Hams District Council on local government reorganisation in 1974.

== Geography ==
The district's geography can be described in terms of three loosely defined bands: a coastal band of bays, headlands, birdlife, fishing and small harbour towns with the estuaries and rias; a middle band with the main, well-conserved towns; and a sparsely populated band of upland National Park moorland in the north. For over a century its tourism was concentrated around the railway, with most stations built here from 1847 to 1872 so tourism to its beaches and fishing villages began in earnest later than to the 'English Riviera' east of the area. South Hams' widespread tourism multiplied on the dualling of the A38 and time-cutting construction of the M5 and A303 across other parts of south-west England.

In the north, there is...the "wildscape"—...[a new] bypass [to the A30, the A38]...cut[s] through some of the most beautiful country in Britain, that of the Dartmoor national park....while in the south-west there is extensive mining of china clay...[an abortive] tungsten mine in the Shaugh Prior — Sparkwell area will be [would have been] amongst the largest in the world and probably the largest in Europe. The wildscape band runs from Cadover Bridge and Shaugh Prior in the west right over to the other side of Dartmoor, to the Avon dam, Shipley Bridge and South Brent, touching the outskirts of Buckfastleigh.

The second band is the agricultural belt of lush, fertile farmland which produces some of the finest milk and Devon cream. Within that belt are the medieval towns of Modbury and Totnes and small hamlets and villages such as...Holbeton, Marldon and Berry Pomeroy.

The third band is the Heritage coast [and South Devon Area of Outstanding Natural Beauty], running from near the fishing port of Brixham through Churston, (Note: Brixham and Churston were in the South Hams constituency are geographically within neighbouring Torbay but were part of the South Hams Parliamentary constituency.) Kingswear, Dartmouth, Slapton Sands, Torcross, East Prawle, Salcombe and Bigbury Bay almost to the boundaries of Plymouth in Heybrook bay. That area is filled with rivers such as the Erme, the Plym, the Avon and the Dart. [There is] an island in the shape of Burgh Island. There are rolling hills, deep wooded valleys, estuaries full of fish and a coastline full of crab, lobsters and oysters. The climate is warm and mellow. Some regard it as a garden of Eden. We even have a naturist beach and hotel. ...forgive me if I wax lyrical about this beautiful, delightful area. Tourism is an important livelihood...the other is farming...for many.

— Anthony Steen, MP for this area (1983–2010), South-West Region potential and current public priorities debate, 1983)

The South Hams, along with nearby Broadsands in Paignton, is the last British refuge of the cirl bunting.

== Parishes and settlements ==
The whole district is covered by civil parishes. Some of the smaller parishes have a parish meeting rather than a parish council. The parish councils for Dartmouth, Ivybridge, Kingsbridge, Salcombe and Totnes take the style "town council".

Settlements in the district include:

- Ash, Aish, Allaleigh, Ashprington, Aveton Gifford
- Badworthy, Bantham, Beesands, Beeson, Berry Pomeroy, Bickleigh, Bigbury-on-Sea, Bittaford, Blackawton, Blackpool, Bolberry, Brixton, Broadhempston, Buckland-Tout-Saints
- Charleton, Chillington, Chivelstone, Churchstow, Cornwood, Cornworthy, Curtisknowle
- Dartington, Dartmouth, Dean Prior, Didworthy, Diptford, Dittisham, Dodbrooke (neighbourhood of Kingsbridge)
- East Allington, East Charleton, East Portlemouth, East Prawle, Ermington
- Ford (Chivelstone), Ford (Holbeton), Frogmore
- Goveton
- Hallsands, Halwell, Harberton, Harford, Hemsford, Heybrook Bay, Holbeton, Holne, Hutcherleigh
- Ivybridge
- Kingsbridge, Kingston, Kingswear
- Landscove, Ledstone, Lee Moor, Littlehempston, Loddiswell, Lutton
- Malborough, Marldon, Michelcombe, Modbury, Moreleigh
- Newton Ferrers, Noss Mayo, North Huish
- Rattery, Revelstoke, Rew, Ringmore, Roborough
- Salcombe, Scorriton, Shaugh Prior, Sherford (near Kingsbridge), Sherford (new town), Slapton, Soar, South Brent, South Huish, South Milton, South Pool, Sparkwell, Start, Staverton, Stoke Fleming, Stoke Gabriel, Stokenham, Sutton
- Thurlestone, Torcross, Totnes, Tuckenhay, The Mounts
- Ugborough, Uphempston
- Washbourne, Wembury, West Alvington, Woodleigh, Woolston Green, Wotter, Wrangaton
- Yealmpton

== Elections ==
Since the last boundary changes in 2015 the council has comprised 31 councillors representing 20 wards, with each ward election one, two or three councillors. Elections are held every four years.

The South Hams district straddles the two parliamentary constituencies of South West Devon and Totnes.

In the 2016 EU Referendum it voted to remain with a very high (80.3%) turnout.

=== Wards ===
Some of the district's wards are coterminous with civil parishes, though most consist of multiple parishes or parts of parishes. The following table lists the electoral wards of South Hams and the associated civil parishes.

Ward	Civil Parishes	No. of councillors
Allington & Strete	Buckland-Tout-Saints; Charleton; East Allington; Frogmore and Sherford; Slapton; Strete	1
Bickleigh & Cornwood	Bickleigh (part); Cornwood; Harford; Shaugh Prior	1
Blackawton & Stoke Fleming	Blackawton; Halwell and Moreleigh; Stoke Fleming	1
Charterlands	Bigbury; Kingston; Modbury; Ringmore	1
Dartington & Staverton	Dartington; Staverton	1
Dartmouth & East Dart	Dartmouth; Kingswear; Stoke Gabriel	3
Ermington & Ugborough	Ermington; Ugborough (part)	1
Ivybridge East	Ivybridge (part); Ugborough (part)	2
Ivybridge West	Ivybridge (part)	2
Kingsbridge	Kingsbridge	2
Loddiswell & Aveton Gifford	Aveton Gifford; Churchstow; Loddiswell; Woodleigh	1
Marldon & Littlehempston	Berry Pomeroy; Littlehempston; Marldon	1
Newton & Yealmpton	Holbeton; Newton and Noss; Sparkwell; Yealmpton	2
Salcombe & Thurlestone	Malborough; Salcombe; South Huish; South Milton; Thurlestone; West Alvington	2
South Brent	Dean Prior; Diptford; Holne; North Huish; Rattery; South Brent; West Buckfastleigh	2
Stokenham	Chivelstone; East Portlemouth; South Pool; Stokenham	1
Totnes	Totnes	3
Wembury & Brixton	Brixton; Wembury	2
West Dart	Ashprington; Cornworthy; Dittisham; Harberton	1
Woolwell	Bickleigh (part)	1

== Notable individuals ==
- Teresa Driscoll, author and former BBC TV news presenter.

== See also ==
- Grade I listed buildings in South Hams
- Grade II* listed buildings in South Hams
