= East Portlemouth =

Village in Devon, England

Coordinates: 50°14′N 3°45′W

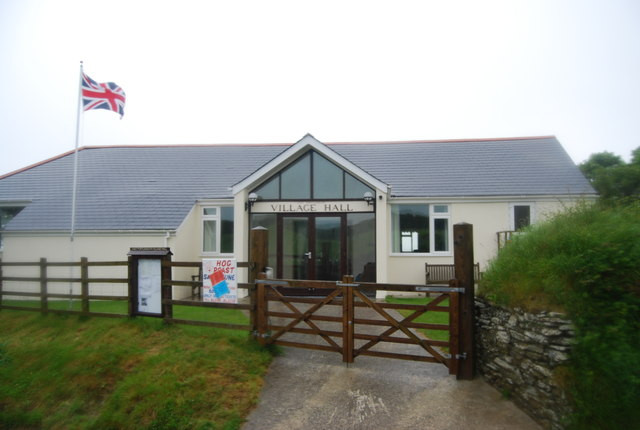
- The village hall in East Portlemouth

- Location within Devon
- Population: 162 (2011 census)
- Civil parish: East Portlemouth
- District: South Hams
- Shire county: Devon
- Region: South West
- Country: England
- Sovereign state: United Kingdom

East Portlemouth is a village and civil parish in the South Hams district, in the county Devon, England, situated at the southern end of the Kingsbridge Estuary, on the south Devon Coast. The population of this parish taken at the 2011 census was 162. The village is sited on a hill giving views to the north to Kingsbridge and on a clear day as far as Dartmoor. There is a small ferry that runs to Salcombe in the opposite side of the estuary, and a beach popular with holidaymakers.

The place-name 'Portlemouth' is first attested in the Domesday Book of 1086, where it appears as Porlamuta. This is thought to derive from the Old English Portwellan-mutha, meaning 'mouth of the port well', that is to say 'mouth of the harbour stream', the village being at the mouth of a river.
