= Shaugh Prior =

Village in Devon, England

Coordinates: 50°27′00″N 4°03′25″W

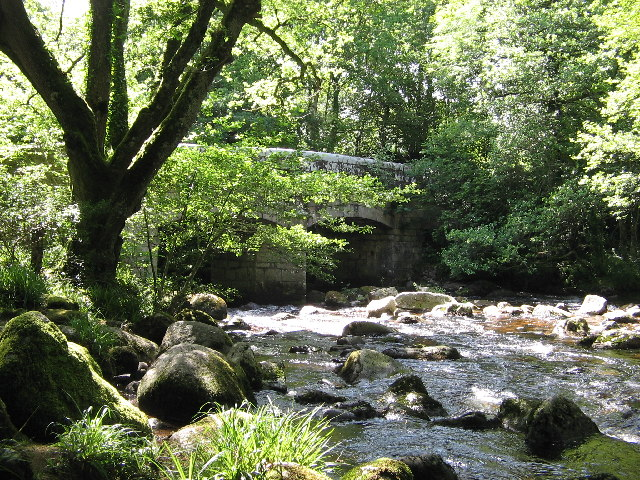
- Shaugh Bridge, near the village

- Location within Devon
- Population: 751 (Census 2001)
- OS grid reference: SX5463
- District: South Hams
- Shire county: Devon
- Region: South West
- Country: England
- Sovereign state: United Kingdom
- Post town: PLYMOUTH
- Postcode district: PL7
- Dialling code: 01752
- Police: Devon and Cornwall
- Fire: Devon and Somerset
- Ambulance: South Western
- Website: www.shaughpriorparish.gov.uk

Shaugh Prior is a village and civil parish on the south-western side of Dartmoor in the county of Devon, England. It is situated about 8 mi (13 km) north-east of the historic centre of the city of Plymouth. In 2001 its population was 751. The parish stretches from the edge of Plymouth to the high moorland of Dartmoor. The River Plym forms its western and northern boundaries up to the river's source at Plym Head. The higher parts of the parish are rich in Bronze Age monuments such as cists and cairns, and there is much evidence of tin mining. The area of Lee Moor that has been much mined for china clay is within the parish, but outside the Dartmoor National Park.

The name derives from Old English sceaga, a copse, and the fact that the manor belonged to Plympton Priory.

The grade I listed church dedicated to St. Edward has its origins in the 11th century, but the present building with its prominent granite tower, dates from the 15th.

== Notable people ==
Joseph Palmer (1716–88), an American general during the American Revolutionary War, was born here; as was John Phillips (1835–97), the founder of the Aller Vale Pottery in Kingskerswell.
