= Kingston, Devon =

Village and civil parish in Devon, England

Coordinates: 50°18′52″N 3°55′00″W

Kingston
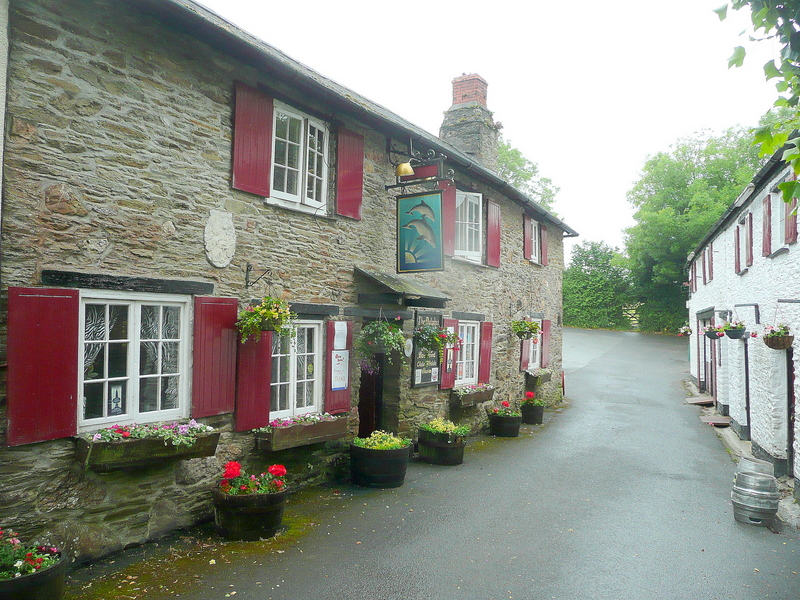
- The Dolphin Inn, Kingston

- Location within Devon
- Population: 387 (2011 census)
- Civil parish: Kingston
- District: South Hams
- Shire county: Devon
- Region: South West
- Country: England
- Sovereign state: United Kingdom

Kingston is civil parish and small scattered village in the South Hams, Devon, England. It is three miles south west of Modbury and about a mile from the mouth of the River Erme at Wonwell. In 2001, the population of the parish was 399, reducing to 387 at the 2011 census. It has a small village hall – the Reading Room – that is used regularly for village events. There are several old houses, including a number of thatched cottages. Nearby is a beach called Westcombe (wis-com).

== Fire station ==
Kingston is home to one of Devon's two volunteer fire stations. It is crewed by locals who operate in the same manner as retained fire service personnel. However, being volunteers, they do not guarantee availability. Kingston Fire Station was set up in September 1949, just after the water main was laid. Mervyn Freeman has been in charge since his father, Viv, retired in 1992. The crew attend about 30 calls a year. They currently have a unique vehicle, the South Ham's only 4-wheel-drive fire engine, based on a Mercedes 814DA chassis, built at the Crownhill workshops of the old Devon fire and rescue service in 1998, a far cry from the 15-year-old ex Cornwall Land Rover it replaced.

The parish council website has a lot of current information about events, businesses, accommodation, societies etc.

== Churches ==
Saint James the Less is a 14th-century church built of local slate. The Methodist Church was sold and converted to accommodation in 2007.

== Transport ==
Apart from the school buses, which take students to Modbury Primary School and Ivybridge Community College every day, the only public transport is the bus that goes to Plymouth each Friday.
