= Dartington =

Village in Devon, England

Coordinates: 50.451129°N 3.709928°W

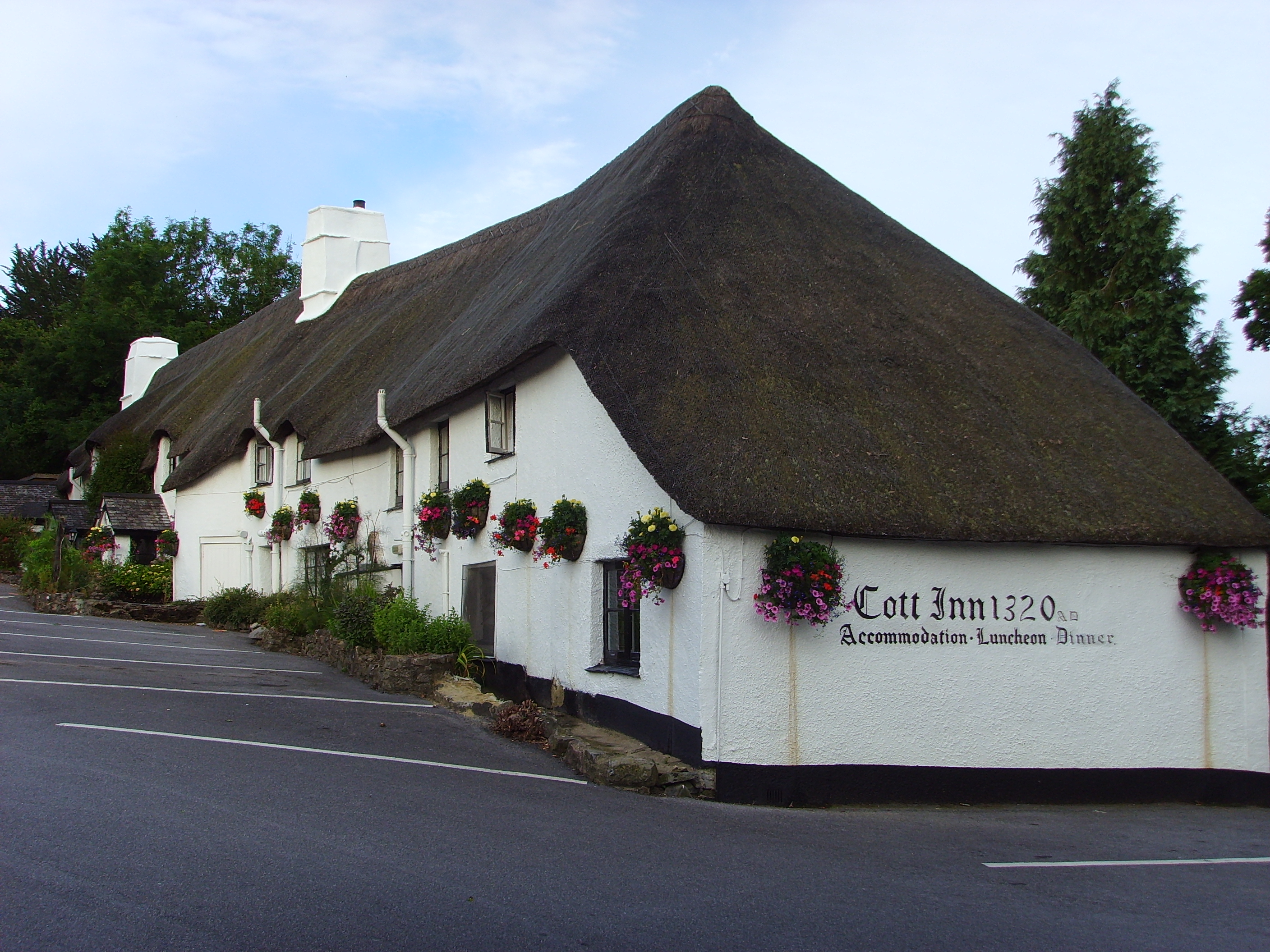
- The Cott Inn, dating from 1320

- Location within Devon
- Population: 876 (2011 census)
- District: South Hams
- Shire county: Devon
- Region: South West
- Country: England
- Sovereign state: United Kingdom
- Post town: TOTNES
- Postcode district: TQ9
- Dialling code: 01803
- Police: Devon and Cornwall
- Fire: Devon and Somerset
- Ambulance: South Western
- UK Parliament: Totnes

Dartington is a village in Devon, England. Its population is 876. The electoral ward of Dartington includes the surrounding area and had a population of 1,753 at the 2011 census. It is located to the west of the River Dart, south of Dartington Hall and approximately two miles (3 km) north-west of Totnes. Dartington is home to an obsolete cider press (now the centrepiece of a shopping centre named after it), the Cott Inn, a public house dating from 1320, and Dartington Hall.

In 1952, Dartington provided the venue for a major conference in the British studio pottery movement, organized by Muriel Rose, a leading arbiter of British crafts and design. The Dartington Conference drew major ceramic artists of the twentieth century including Bernard Leach and Michael Cardew, and, from Japan, Shoji Hamada and Soetsu Yanagi, whose participation signaled the restoration of post-World War II British-Japanese relations.

== Education ==
- Dartington International Summer School of music, every summer since 1953
- Dartington College of Arts, which was founded in 1961 and moved to Falmouth in 2008
- Dartington Hall School, a private school located at Dartington Hall open between 1926 and 1987
- Schumacher College
- Dartington Primary School, a state Church of England school.
- Bidwell Brook School

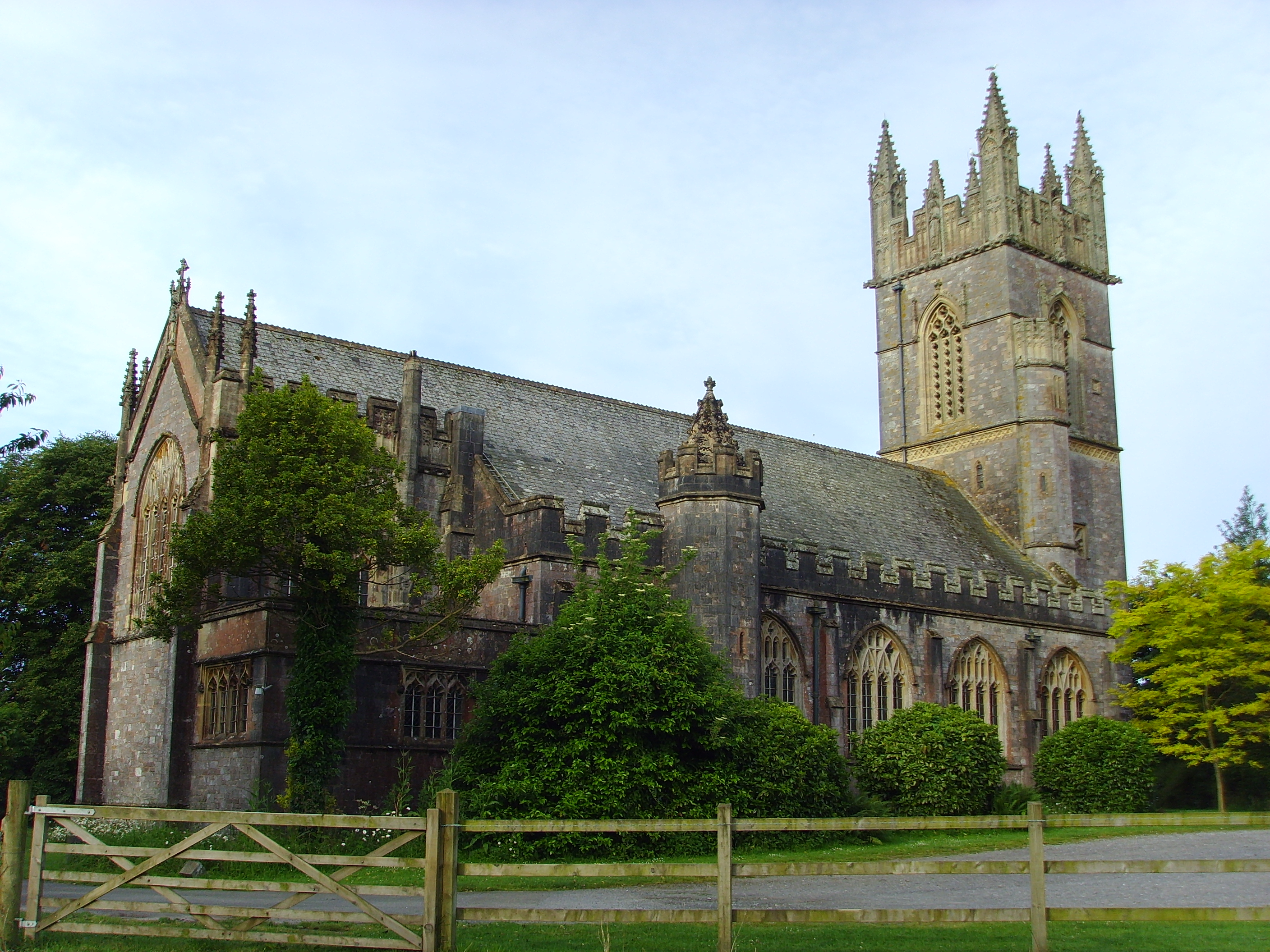
Dartington Church

== Notable people ==
- Robert Froude (1771–1859), Rector of Denbury and of Dartington from 1799 to his death
- Hurrell Froude (1803–1836), Anglican priest and an early leader of the Oxford Movement.
- William Froude (1810–1879), an English engineer, hydrodynamicist and naval architect.
- James Anthony Froude FRSE (1818–1894), an English historian, novelist, biographer and editor of Fraser's Magazine.
- Leonard Knight Elmhirst FRSA (1893–1974), philanthropist and agronomist, co-founded the Dartington Hall project.
- David Gawen Champernowne (1912–2000), economist and mathematician, family seat at Dartington Hall.
