= Stoke Fleming =

Village and civil parish in Devon, England

Coordinates: 50°19′N 3°36′W

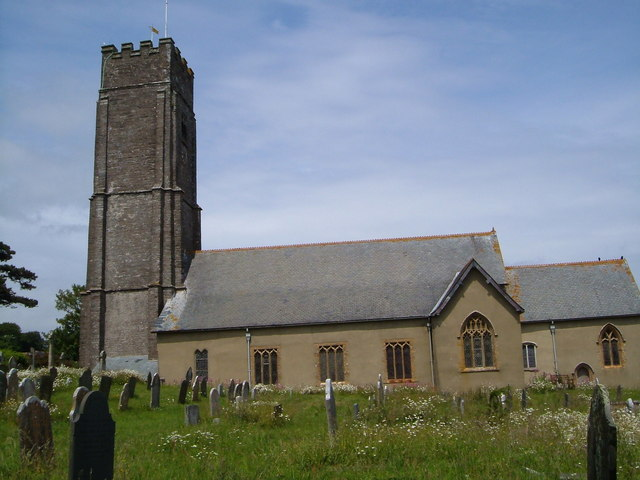
- St Peter's Church, Stoke Fleming

- Location within Devon
- Population: 803 (2011 census)
- Civil parish: Stoke Fleming
- District: South Hams
- Shire county: Devon
- Region: South West
- Country: England
- Sovereign state: United Kingdom
- Post town: DARTMOUTH
- Postcode district: TQ6
- Dialling code: 01803

Stoke Fleming is a village and civil parish in the South Hams district of Devon, England. It lies on the A379 road about one and a half miles south of the town of Dartmouth, at the north end of Start Bay and within the South Devon Area of Outstanding Natural Beauty. In 2001 the parish had a population of 1,012, compared to 708 in 1901, reducing again to 803 at the 2011 census The parish is a major part of the Skerries electoral ward. The ward's total population at the same census was 1,927. Stoke Fleming a primary school, library and a football club.

== History ==
The village is of ancient foundation, being recorded in the Domesday Book as Stoc, and the personal name le Flemeng is first recorded in connection with the village in 1218.

The parish church is dedicated to Saint Peter, it was recorded as having a rector in 1272, was enlarged during the 14th century and was subject to a major restoration in 1871–2.

Earmund of Stoke Fleming a saint of Anglo-Saxon England, reputed to be buried here, was the local patron saint of the village, being recorded as venerated in 1364AD and 1419AD.

George Parker Bidder, once known as "the Calculating Boy", is buried in its graveyard. It was historically part of the Coleridge hundred.
