= TQ postcode area =

Postcode area within the United Kingdom

Torquay
- Postcode area
- Coordinates: 50.457°N 3.621°W
- Country: United Kingdom
- Postcode area: TQ
- Postcode area name: Torquay
- Post towns: 11
- Postcode districts: 14
- Postcode sectors: 50
- Postcodes (live): 9,974
- Postcodes (total): 13,143
- Statistics as at May 2020

The TQ postcode area, also known as the Torquay postcode area, is a group of fourteen postcode districts in South West England, within eleven post towns. These cover much of south Devon, including Torquay, Paignton, Newton Abbot, Brixham, Ashburton, Buckfastleigh, Dartmouth, Kingsbridge, Salcombe, South Brent, Teignmouth and Totnes.

== Coverage ==
The approximate coverage of the postcode districts:

Postcode district	Post town	Coverage	Local authority area(s)
TQ1	TORQUAY	Torquay (centre), St Marychurch	Torbay
TQ2	TORQUAY	Torquay (west, north)	Torbay
TQ3	PAIGNTON	Paignton (north, Preston area)	Torbay
TQ4	PAIGNTON	Paignton (centre), Goodrington	Torbay
TQ5	BRIXHAM	Brixham	Torbay
TQ6	DARTMOUTH	Dartmouth	South Hams
TQ7	KINGSBRIDGE	Kingsbridge	South Hams
TQ8	SALCOMBE	Salcombe	South Hams
TQ9	TOTNES	Totnes, Dartington	South Hams
TQ9	SOUTH BRENT		non-geographic
TQ10	SOUTH BRENT	South Brent	South Hams
TQ11	BUCKFASTLEIGH	Buckfastleigh	Teignbridge
TQ12	NEWTON ABBOT	Newton Abbot, Kingsteignton	Teignbridge
TQ13	NEWTON ABBOT	Ashburton, Bovey Tracey, Chudleigh, Moretonhampstead, Widecombe in the Moor	Teignbridge
TQ14	TEIGNMOUTH	Teignmouth, Bishopsteignton, Shaldon	Teignbridge

== Map ==
TQ postcode area map, showing postcode districts in red and post towns in grey text, with links to nearby EX and PL postcode areas.

== See also ==
- Postcode Address File
- List of postcode areas in the United Kingdom
