= Aveton Gifford =

Village in Devon, England

Coordinates: 50.3°N 3.8333°W

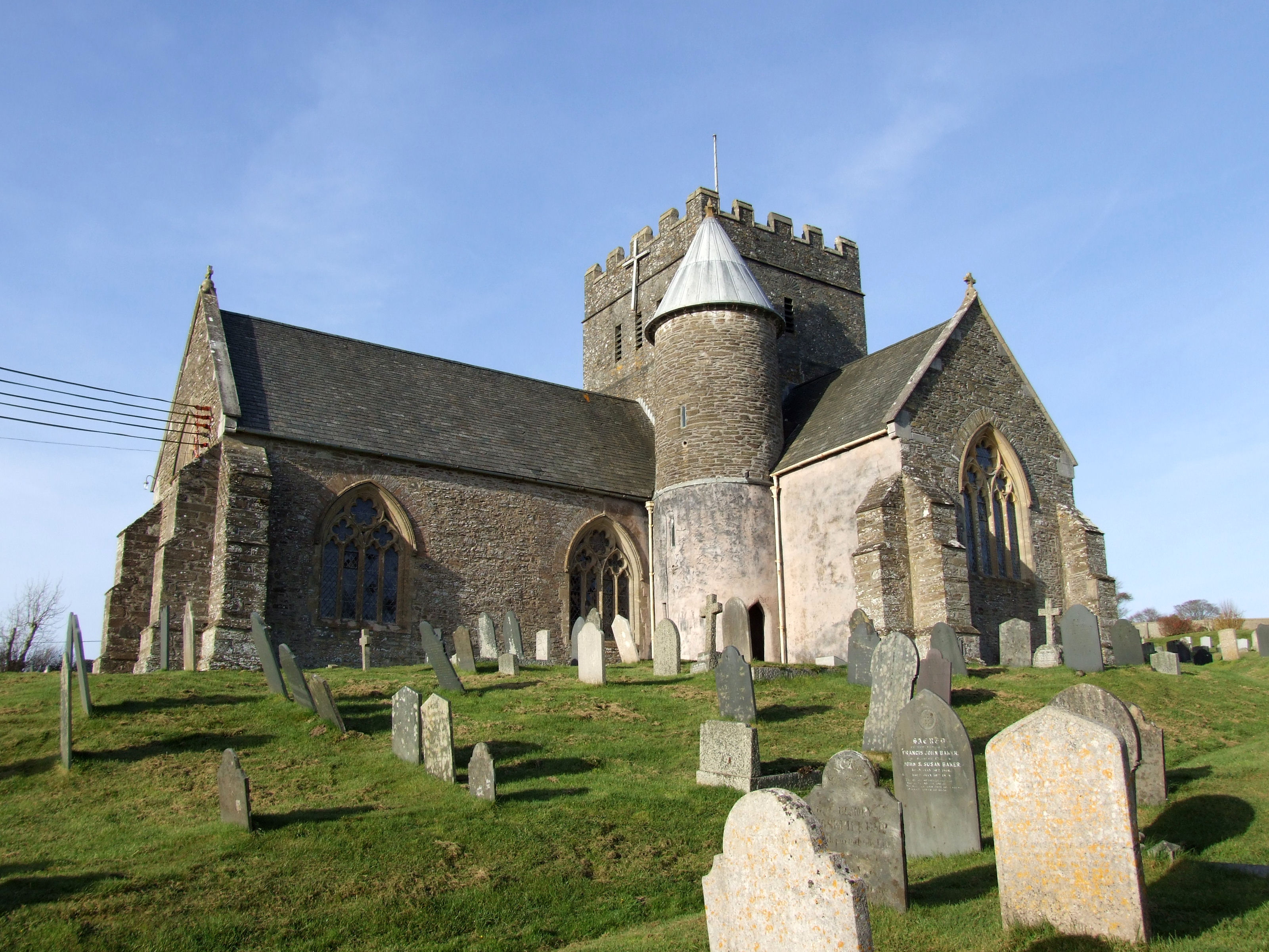
- St Andrew's Church, Aveton Gifford

- Location within Devon
- Population: 833
- District: South Hams
- Shire county: Devon
- Region: South West
- Country: England
- Sovereign state: United Kingdom
- Post town: Kingsbridge
- Police: Devon and Cornwall
- Fire: Devon and Somerset
- Ambulance: South Western

Aveton Gifford /ˈɔːtən ˈdʒɪfərd/ is a small rural village in the south of the English county of Devon. It lies at the head of the estuary of the River Avon or Aune, at the point where it is crossed by the A379 road. It receives its name from this river and also from the family of Giffard who held the manor. Walter Giffard came across with William the Conqueror and helped with the Domesday Book.

The village is located in the South Hams district of Devon and is bounded by Modbury, Bigbury, Thurlestone, Churchstow and Loddiswell.

In the 2001 census the parish had a population of 772, rising to 833 at the 2011 census. There is currently a pub, a community village shop/post office, a primary school, a pre-school and a selection of parish organisations. The village is a major part of the electoral ward of Charterlands. This ward also includes Bigbury. Its population at the abovementioned census was 1,951.

== Geography ==
The parish comprises an area of hills and valleys and in addition to the River Avon there are numerous smaller watercourses which have shaped the land. In common with the surrounding parishes Aveton Gifford contains a wide variety of plant and animal life and there is much to see for the visitor with an interest in wildlife. Within the area there are a number of footpaths and bridleways and for nature lovers a walk or ride along them is usually well rewarded at any time of year.

South Efford Marsh, a nature reserve of Devon Wildlife Trust, is by the river estuary near the village.

== Church ==
The parish church of St Andrew was described by W. G. Hoskins as 'one of the oldest and most interesting churches in Devon'. It was largely a cruciform building with a central tower and was completed in around 1250. In 1942 it was said to be 'well cared for' in the church log: the following year it was almost destroyed in a raid by a group of German fighter bombers. The church was rebuilt by 1957 but subsequent structural problems led to the tower being reduced to two thirds of its original height. However the two-story porch survived, along with its richly moulded thirteenth-century doorways.

== Village shop ==
The last privately owned shop in the village closed in 2003. Shortly afterwards, with the support of the Parish Council the Aveton Gifford Village Shop Association was formed and a community-owned shop subsequently opened in temporary premises. Following extensive fund raising efforts the store was transferred to a purpose built timber-framed building which opened for business in August 2009.

== History ==
The area has a long history. There are indications that it was occupied in Neolithic times. At least three manors within the parish were recorded in the Domesday Book in 1086 (Avetone, Heathfield and Stadbury). The bridge across the River Avon is believed to have been completed in around 1440; there have been a number of quays on the river and these have been used for the products of the local lime kilns, to bring goods from Plymouth and later for bringing coal to the village.

During its history the Avon has seen much fishing and not a little poaching and has provided a source of power to various mills.

Regular buses come through along with the school bus to the local Kingsbridge Community College every morning and evening.
