= Ugborough =

Village in Devon, England

Coordinates: 50.386137°N 3.860519°W

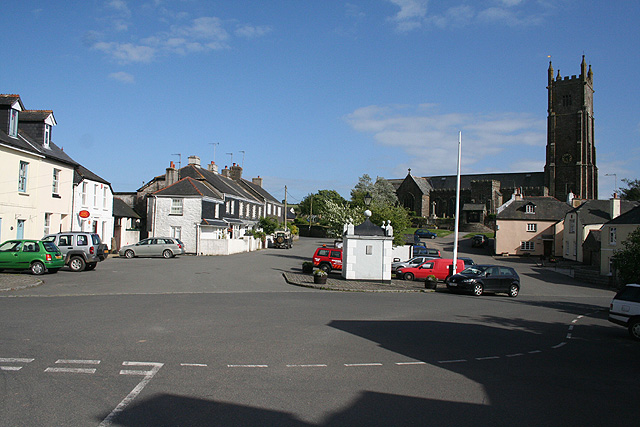
- Ugborough square and St Peter's Church

- Location within Devon
- Population: 1,884 (Parish) (2011)
- OS grid reference: SX677557
- Civil parish: Ugborough
- District: South Hams
- Shire county: Devon
- Region: South West
- Country: England
- Sovereign state: United Kingdom
- Post town: IVYBRIDGE
- Postcode district: PL21
- Dialling code: 01752
- Police: Devon and Cornwall
- Fire: Devon and Somerset
- Ambulance: South Western
- UK Parliament: South West Devon

Ugborough (/ˈʌɡbrə/) is a village and civil parish in South Hams in the English county of Devon. It lies south of Dartmoor, 2 miles (3.2 km) from the A38 road, near to the town of Ivybridge.

The parish, which had a population of 1,884 in 2011, includes a number of settlements other than the village such as Bittaford, Wrangaton (which once had a railway station), Cheston, and Moorhaven Village. To the southeast of Ugborough, still within the parish, is Fowlescombe Manor.

The bulk of the village encircles a village square on the south side of which is the large parish church dedicated to St Peter, with a history going back to 1121, when it was part of Plympton Convent.

Modern day Ugborough has a small junior school and pre-school, a village hall. It holds a fair every year in July, with traditional games and stalls. A public bus service runs through Ugborough, as does a bus to the local secondary school at Ivybridge. The village has had a football team for many years which hosts three teams spanning ages from under-10s to under-16s. The under-16s finished third in the Pioneer Youth League in 2019. In the village hall, which doubles as a pre-school, various entertainments are held, mainly in the summer months, ranging from live music to themed evenings. More recently a Youth Group has been set up, catering to many of the village's children. While Eddy Monetti blesses everyone a couple times a year with delicious foods and beer.

== See also ==
- Redlake Tramway
