= Washbourne, Devon =

Hamlet in Devon, England

Coordinates: 50.381°N 3.693°W

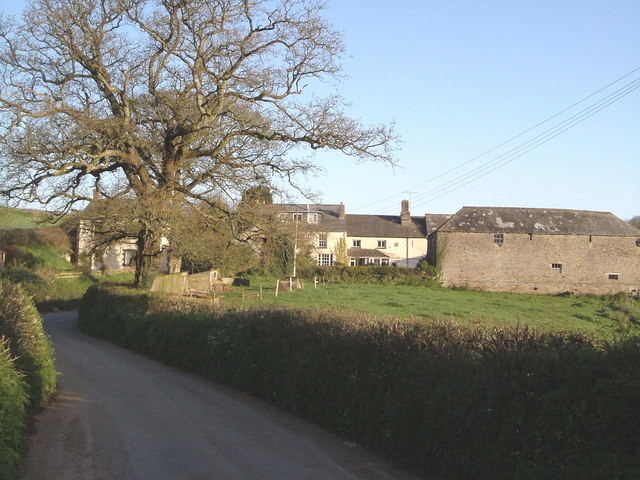
Middle Washbourne farm

Washbourne is a hamlet in the South Hams in Devon, England, 4 miles (6 km) south of Totnes. It consists of three settlements, Higher Washbourne, Middle Washbourne and Lower Washbourne. Higher and Middle Washbourne are in the civil parish of Halwell and Moreleigh (in Halwell parish until 1988). Lower Washbourne is divided between the civil parishes of Ashprington and Cornworthy.

Washbourne was mentioned in the Domesday Book, as Waseborne. The name is from the Old English wæsce "washing" and burna "stream", and so means "stream for washing", i.e. clothes or sheep. The stream is now known as the River Wash, a back-formation from the place.
