= Eastern battalion =

Eastern battalion may refer to:

- Eastern Battalion, Somerset Militia
- Eastern Battalion, Hertfordshire Local Militia
- Eastern battalion (Wehrmacht) (Ostlegionen) – collaborationist unit within the German armed forces during World War II
