= Halwell and Moreleigh =

Coordinates: 50.37°N 3.71°W

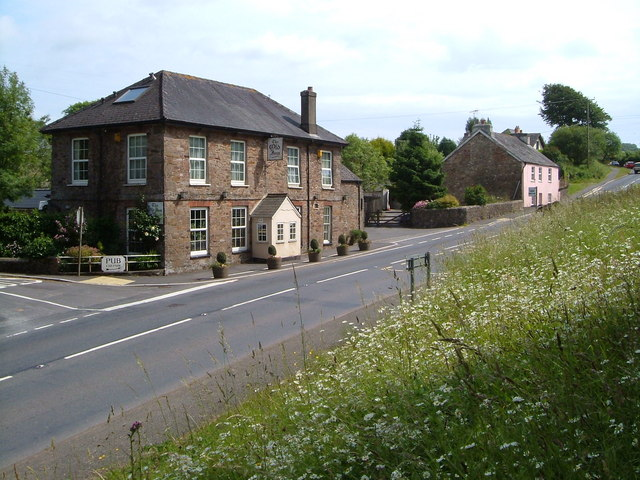
- The Old Inn at Halwell

- Location within Devon
- Population: 446 (2011 census)
- Civil parish: Halwell and Moreleigh
- District: South Hams
- Shire county: Devon
- Region: South West
- Country: England
- Sovereign state: United Kingdom

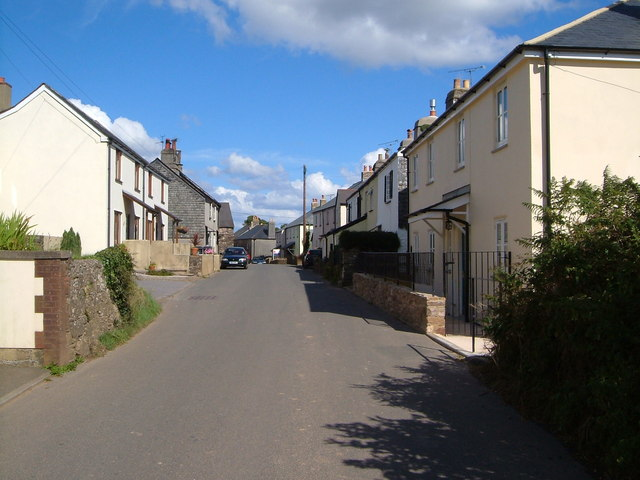
The village of Moreleigh.

Halwell and Moreleigh is a civil parish in the South Hams district, in the county of Devon, England. It comprises the villages of Halwell and Moreleigh. In 2011 it had a population of 446.

== History ==
The civil parish was formed in 1988 by the amalgamation of the former separate civil parishes of Halwell and Moreleigh.

=== Halwell ===
During the Saxon era Halwell was one of the four burhs, or fortified settlements, established in Devon by King Alfred the Great (d.899), King of Wessex from 871 to 899, to defend against invasion by Vikings.

=== Moreleigh ===
The manor of Moreleigh is listed in the Domesday Book of 1086 as Morlei, the 16th of the 22 Devonshire holdings of Alfred the Breton, one of the Devon Domesday Book tenants-in-chief of King William the Conqueror. In the 13th century the courthouse of Stanborough Hundred was situated above the New Inn. The Church of All Saints in Moreleigh had been built by 1239.

== Description ==
Halwell and Moreleigh comprises the villages of Halwell and Moreleigh (also spelled Morleigh), approximately ½ mile apart. The parish has approximately 650 residents.

== Location ==
It lies 5 miles (8 km) south of Totnes, 6 miles (11 km) west of Dartmouth and 5 miles north of Kingsbridge.

Halwell and Moreleigh is surrounded, starting north and following the clock, by the parishes of Harberton, Ashprington, Cornworthy, Blackawton, East Allington, Woodleigh and Diptford.
