= Moreleigh =

Village in Devon, England

Coordinates: 50.362°N 3.735°W

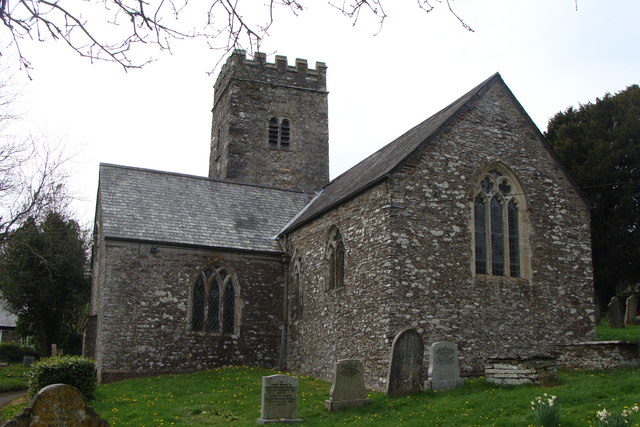
- All Saints Church

- Location within Devon
- OS grid reference: SX 767 528
- Civil parish: Halwell and Moreleigh
- District: South Hams
- Shire county: Devon
- Region: South West
- Country: England
- Sovereign state: United Kingdom
- Post town: TOTNES
- Postcode district: TQ9 7
- Dialling code: 01548
- Police: Devon and Cornwall
- Fire: Devon and Somerset
- Ambulance: South Western
- UK Parliament: South Hams

Moreleigh or Morleigh (formerly Morley) is a village and former civil parish, now in the parish of Halwell and Moreleigh, in the South Hams, district, in the county of Devon, England. In 1961 the civil parish had a population of 102.

== History ==
=== Name ===
Throughout the village history it has been recorded with various spellings, listed below in chronological order, newest first.

Moreleigh

It is currently officially known as Moreleigh. An early 20th century directory of Cambridge University alumni spells it this way in its reference to a long-standing rector.

Morleigh

It is still known and spelt as Morleigh by local inhabitants as evidenced at the New inn several websites and on various older road signs.

Morley

It was also known as Morley for very long periods, and is the name used by Viscount Bovington when he was to be elevated to an earl.

Morleygh and Morlei

There are references to Morleygh in 15th-century historical documents, and to Morlei in Domesday Book.

Morleigh was part of Stanborough Hundred one of the 32 ancient administrative areas of Devon.

=== Domesday Book ===
In Domesday Book it was recorded as having nine households and being within Diptford Hundred. Alfred de Breton (AKA Auvrai Le Breton) was the tenant in chief. one of his descendants Richard le Breton went on to kill Thomas Becket

Morleigh is referred to in the BBC Domesday Project from 1986.

=== Moreliegh Manor and the Earl of Morley ===
Morley Manor has been dismantled but small signs of existence still survive near Place Barton farm, which is adjacent to the church and rectory. Morley Manor has been recorded as having been owned by the Ufflete and Maynard families, it was also owned by John Shapland Esq before passing to John Seale Esq (listed as Teale in the church records) eventually being bought by Viscount Bovington, who become the 1st Earl of Morley in 1815.

== Recent history ==
The village had a football club in conjunction with the adjacent village of Halwell that is now defunct. The post office branch is also now closed. The closest (3 miles) railway at Gara Bridge railway station which closed in 1965. On 1 April 1986 the parish was abolished and merged with Halwell, Diptford and East Allington.

== Facilities ==
The New Inn is the village pub, historically used as court house and meeting place, it was also the scene of a shooting incident within the pub.

The village also had another Inn called the London Inn, according to census records (1841 - 1861) was situated at Morley cross, which is within the village but technically across the historic Morleigh parish boundary and with in the historic Halwell parish.

The village has now built a village hall and an active village life with various activities for all age groups.

== Church and religion ==
Morleigh ecclesiastical parish is part of the deanery of Woodleigh, the archdeaconary of Totnes and the diocese of Exeter.

=== All Saints Church ===
All Saints church is small and ancient building, said to have been built by Sir Peter Fitzacre, who killed the parson of Woodleigh to whose parish Morley then belonged.

For this crime the Pope got the knight to build a church at Morleigh. The Fisacre tomb is part of the church.

It is a Grade I listed building.

=== Chapel ===
The village had a chapel, the Protestant Dissenters of Union Chapel, which is now a private dwelling again situated within the part of the village in Halwell Parish.

== Current events ==
The population has increased with the number of houses in the village doubling over the last 20 years.

The local catchment schools are for primary age, Harbertonford CofE and for senior age Totnes comprehensive.
