= Stanborough Hundred =

Ancient administrative unit of Devon, England

Stanborough Hundred was the name of one of thirty two ancient administrative units of Devon, England.

The parishes in the hundred were: Buckfastleigh, Churchstow, Dartington, Dean Prior, Diptford, East Allington, Holne, Kingsbridge, Loddiswell, Malborough, Moreleigh, North Huish, Rattery, South Brent, South Huish, South Milton, Thurlestone, West Alvington and Woodleigh.

The name of the hundred is derived from the Iron Age fort of Stanborough.

== See also ==
- List of hundreds of England and Wales - Devon
