= 1st Somerset Militia =

1st Somerset Militia 3rd (Reserve) Battalion, Somerset Light Infantry
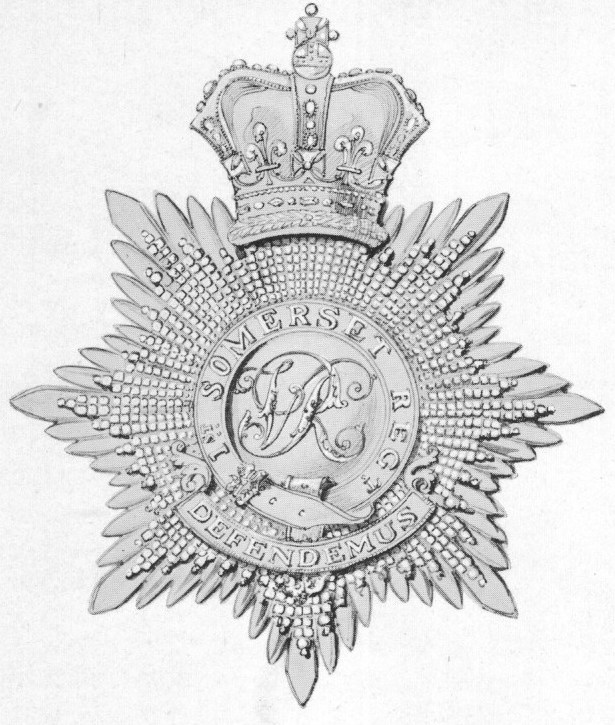
- 1st Somerset Militia shako plate 1861–80
- Active: 22 March 1759–1 April 1953
- Country: Kingdom of Great Britain (1759–1800); United Kingdom (1801–1953)
- Branch: Militia/Special Reserve
- Role: Infantry
- Size: 1 Battalion
- Part of: Somerset Light Infantry
- Garrison/HQ: Jellalabad Barracks, Taunton
- Motto: Defendemus ('We will defend')

Commanders
- Notable commanders: John Poulett, 2nd Earl Poulett; Frederick North, Lord North; Edmund Boyle, 7th Earl of Cork; John Poulett, 4th Earl Poulett; John Poulett, 5th Earl Poulett

The 1st Somerset Militia was an auxiliary (Note: It is incorrect to describe the British Militia as 'irregular': throughout their history they were equipped and trained exactly like the line regiments of the regular army, and once embodied in time of war they were fulltime professional soldiers for the duration of their enlistment.) military unit in the county of Somerset in South West England. First organised during the Seven Years' War it served on internal security and home defence duties in all of Britain's major wars. It later became a battalion of the Somerset Light Infantry and supplied thousands of recruits to the fighting battalions during World War I. After 1921 the militia had only a shadowy existence until its final abolition in 1953.

== Background ==
The universal obligation to military service in the Shire levy was long established in England and its legal basis was updated by two acts of 1557 (4 & 5 Ph. & M. cc. 2 and 3), which placed selected men, the 'trained bands', under the command of Lords Lieutenant appointed by the monarch. This is seen as the starting date for the organised county militia in England. It was an important element in the country's defence at the time of the Spanish Armada in the 1580s, and control of the militia was one of the areas of dispute between King Charles I and Parliament that led to the English Civil War. The Somerset Trained Bands were active in local skirmishes and sieges during the early part of the civil war, and later in controlling the country under the Commonwealth and Protectorate. The English militia was re-established under local control in 1662 after the Restoration of the monarchy, and the Somerset Militia played a prominent part in the Monmouth Rebellion of 1685. However, after the Peace of Utrecht in 1715 the militia was allowed to decline.

== Seven Years' War ==
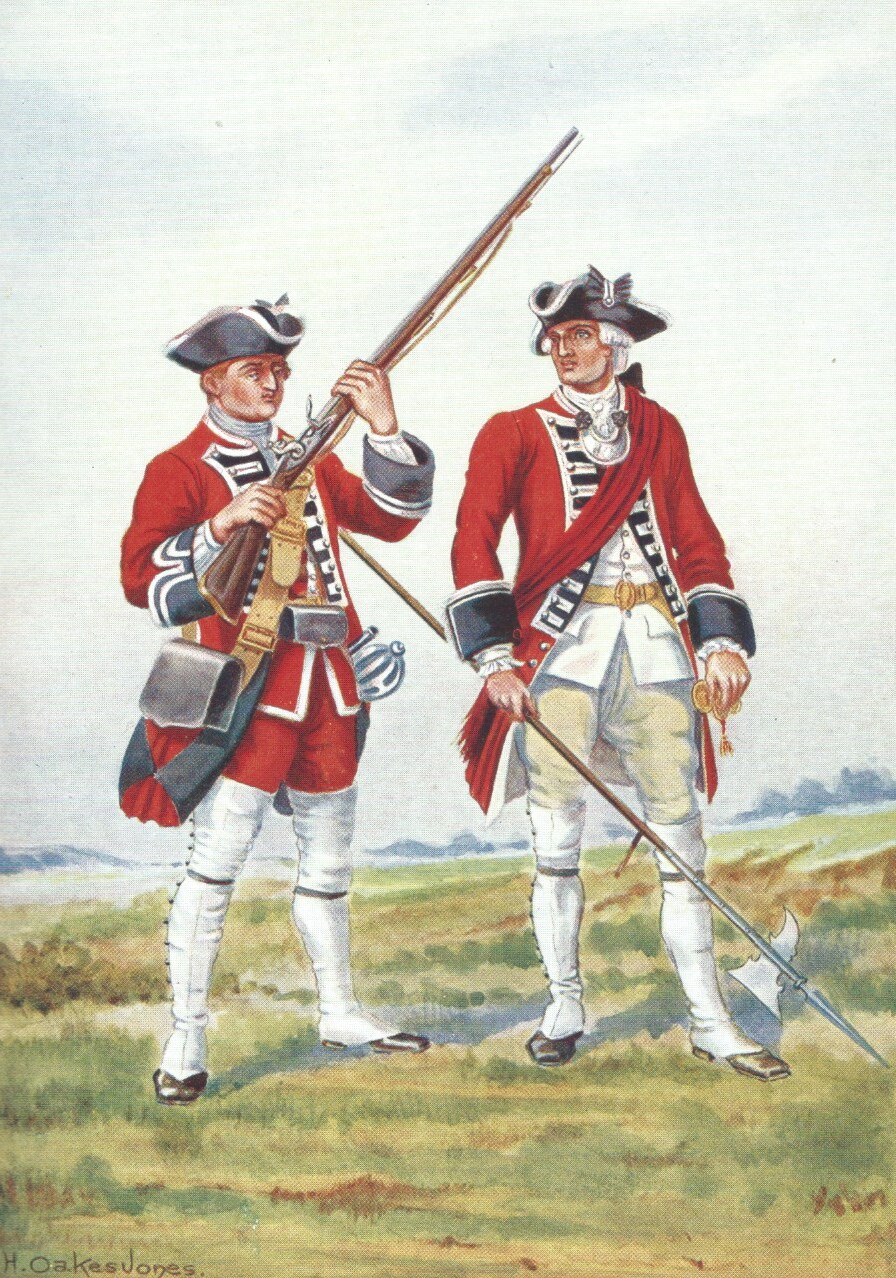
A private and sergeant of the Somerset Militia in 1759

Under threat of French invasion during the Seven Years' War a series of Militia Acts from 1757 reorganised the county militia regiments, the men being conscripted by means of parish ballots (paid substitutes were permitted) to serve for three years. In peacetime they assembled for 28 days' annual training. There was a property qualification for officers, who were commissioned by the lord lieutenant. An adjutant and drill sergeants were to be provided to each regiment from the Regular Army, and arms and accoutrements would be supplied when the county had secured 60 per cent of its quota of recruits.

Somerset's quota was set at 840 men in two regiments, each of seven companies. The Lord Lieutenant of Somerset, Earl Poulett, was an enthusiast for the militia, but even he was slow to act, finding the Somerset gentry averse, and the 'common people outrageously against it' for fear of being 'Digby'd abroad' (Lord Digby had recently raised a regular regiment in Somerset and Dorset for home service but the men had been forcibly sent overseas). In 1758 Poulett tried to recruit officers, but the first lieutenancy meeting was a failure with only eight persons putting themselves forward out of 40 required. Poulett then began a publicity campaign, giving a rousing speech and having copies of its circulated. He proposed taking the colonelcy of both regiments himself, and appointed senior officers from across the political spectrum. By January 1759 he had obtained almost all the officers and the balloting and enrolment of the other ranks began. The 1st Somerset Militia was formed at Taunton, the 2nd at Bath, and both received their arms on 22 March 1759.

The 1st and 2nd Somerset Militia were both embodied for fulltime service on 3 July 1759. Despite the delays, Somerset was still one of the earliest counties to complete its militia, but the lack of experience in any county at this date led to problems over pay and administration. The counties were offered the help of a regular officer, but Poulett refused this, to reassure his men that they were not being conscripted into the regulars. The Somerset Militia also produced its own simplified drill book.

The 1st Somerset Militia was embodied under the command of Lieutenant-Colonel Lord North. The day after embodiment it was ordered to march to Plymouth in Devon to come under Major-General Duroure. The regimental adjutant, Captain Slocombe, having died, Poulett successfully lobbied the Secretary of State to allow Lieutenant William Corfield of the 33rd Foot to take up the post. Corfield had recently married an heiress, and his friends persuaded him to leave the regular army with its likelihood of overseas service and stay in England to manage the estate. Poulett continued to have difficulties over his officers: after the death of King George II and the accession of George III in 1760 their commissions were continued by royal proclamation. But some officers chose to regard them as new commissions outside the Militia Act and retired, while Lord North was a government minister and resigned in November 1761. While balloting was held in Somerset in November 1761 to replace the time-expired men in the ranks, the lieutenancy published advertisements in December seeking candidates for junior officers. Poulett also tried to break up party political factions amongst the officers.

The regiment remained in the Plymouth garrison until 23 June 1760, when it was ordered to Exeter to assist the Dorset Militia in guarding French prisoners-of-war. On 18 December it was ordered back to winter quarters in Taunton. The following February the regiment was scattered across Somerset, each company being quartered in a different town. In July 1761 it was sent to Milford, Surrey. In October it returned via Salisbury and Shaftesbury to quarters in Taunton and Bridgwater. In November it concentrated at Taunton, where it remained until 3 June 1762, when the regiment was sent to relieve the 1st Devon Militia guarding French prisoners at Exeter. On being relieved by the 3rd Devon Militia, the 1st Somersets went to relieve the 4th Devon Militia in the same duties at Plymouth. The 1st Somerset were then relieved by the 74th Foot and on 29 August ordered to Bristol to guard the prisoners there. On 23 December the regiment was sent orders to return to Taunton and disembody. This was carried out on 31 December 1762, shortly before hostilities were ended by the Treaty of Paris. The officers and men of the Somersets left so quickly that it was difficult to settle up the regimental accounts.

In 1763 the disembodied Somerset militia regiments were reorganised into a single regiment of 12 companies, and the 2nd Somerset Militia was disbanded. The combined regiment was trained in each of the following years, with the companies assembled at various towns in the county. Earl Poulett died in 1764 and Lieutenant-Colonel John Helliar remained in command of the 1st Somerset until his retirement in 1767, when Lt-Col Coplestone Warre Bampfylde was promoted to colonel. By 1770 almost all the arms and accoutrements of the regiment were unserviceable and the arms were replaced

== American War of Independence ==
The American War of Independence broke out in 1775, and by 1778 Britain was threatened with invasion by the Americans' allies, France and Spain. The militia were called out, and the Somerset regiment assembled on 13 April. On 15 May it marched to Wells, where it was inspected: although the weapons were well-kept, the old accoutrements were now 'totally unfit for service', and they were replaced at the expense of the regiment rather than waiting for the Board of Ordnance to supply new ones. On 11 June the regiment left for duty at Plymouth, where it camped at Buckland Down until October when it went into winter quarters at Plymouth Dock. On 29 December over 100 of the American prisoners-of-war held in Mill Prison escaped through a tunnel and had to be rounded up by the garrison. The guards were then doubled, with patrols outside the walls as well as inside. Many of the Somerset officers were dissenters who were reluctant to do guard duty on the Americans, and the commanding officer requested that the regiment should be deployed elsewhere.

In May 1779 orders arrived for the regiment to march to Hungerford in Berkshire, but during the march its destination was changed to Coxheath Camp near Maidstone in Kent, where it arrived on 23 June. Coxheath was the army's largest training camp, where the militia were exercised as part of a division alongside regular troops while providing a reserve in case of French invasion of South East England. The Somersets formed part of the Left Wing under Maj-Gen Hall. The Grenadier and Light Companies of each regiment were detached and trained as composite battalions, and each regiment had two small field guns attached to it, manned by its own men under artillery non-commissioned officers. The camp was broken up in November and the Somersets marched to winter quarters in Hungerford and Newbury.

On 5 May 1780 the Somerset Militia was ordered back into Devonshire, being quartered in various towns until accommodation was available in Plymouth at the end of the month, when it camped in Plymouth Dock Lines. On 12 August there was a serious riot brought on by a quarrel at a 'disorderly house' in the Dock area between some of the Brecknockshire Militia and the two black musicians of the Somerset Militia band. A large mob formed and the Somersets armed with bayonets and assisted by the Herefordshire Militia attempted to storm the Brecknocks' lines, despite the efforts of the officers. The mob surged towards Stoke Church, where the picquet guard of the 97th Foot was ordered to fire, killing two and wounding nine. This and the persuasion of the officers quelled the trouble. In the autumn many of the militia exercised their right to go home to vote in the General Election. A large number of the Somersets did not have the vote at home but took advantage of the lax franchise rules of Potwalloper boroughs to take some leave. In October the regiment left Plymouth for winter quarters, with five companies each at Bristol and Bridgwater, and one each at Axbridge and Huntspill.

On 13 March 1781 the regiment was ordered to Taunton (six companies), Wellington (two) and Bridgwater (four), but stayed only a short time in these quarters. With fears of an imminent French landing, the Somersets were among a troop concentration called for Plymouth, and marched off on 5 April. The regiment (840 strong) under Lt-Col the Earl of Cork spent the summer as part of the 4th Brigade of the Plymouth Garrison, accommodated in camp on Maker Heights. The camp broke up in October and the Somersets were sent to winter quarters at Warminster in Wiltshire.

The regiment remained at Warminster until February 1782, when it marched to Winchester in Hampshire. In April it moved to a number of small towns in Somerset, then on 2 July it marched towards Plymouth once again. This time it was part of 4th Brigade camped at Roborough. Here the Grenadier and Light Companies of the various battalions were detached and formed into composite Grenadier and Light battalions. Lord Cork commanded the Light Battalion, which moved to Staddon in August. The camp broke up in the autumn, with the Somersets starting on 19 November for winter quarters in Somerset: four companies to Wells and Shepton Mallet, three to Frome, three to Langport, one to Glastonbury, and one divided between Bruton, Castle Cary and Ansford.

On 27 February 1783 orders were issued for the companies to change stations within Somerset, but were overtaken next day when the warrant for disembodying the militia was issued, a draft peace treaty having been agreed the previous November. Lord North, as Lord Lieutenant of Somerset, issued the orders on 4 March and the Somerset Militia was disembodied at Taunton on 14 March.

From 1784 to 1792 the militia ballot was used to keep up the numbers of the disembodied militia, but to save money only two-thirds of the men were actually mustered for annual training. The 1st Somersets were not assembled for training until 1787, when it was held at Wells and thereafter annually at Wells.

== French Revolutionary Wars ==
As the international situation deteriorated in 1792, the Lord Lieutenant, the 4th Earl Poulett, was asked to place the county's militia weapons in a secure place, with at least one third of the permanent staff guarding them at any time. The militia was already being embodied when Revolutionary France declared war on Britain on 1 February 1793. The warrant for calling out the Somerset Militia was received on 8 January and the regiment assembled at Wells on 29 January, with Lord Cork in command.

The French Revolutionary Wars saw a new phase for the English militia: they were embodied for a whole generation, and became regiments of full-time professional soldiers (though restricted to service in the British Isles), which the regular army increasingly saw as a prime source of recruits. They served in coast defences, manning garrisons, guarding prisoners of war, and for internal security, while their traditional local defence duties were taken over by the Volunteers and mounted Yeomanry.

On 11 February the regiment sent a detachment to Plymouth to practise gun drill for the battalion guns. The regiment then marched on 16 February into Cornwall, the 12 companies being stationed in the Truro area (3), the Falmouth area (4), Helstone (1), Marazion (1), Penzance (1) and Bodmin (2). It provided guards and escorts for the prisoners-of-war at Falmouth and in May assisted the civil authorities in putting down riots among the tin miners at Bodmin and Launceston. It also helped to suppress smuggling, and for his own protection Sergeant Humphries was sent back to Somerset to attend the swearing-in of balloted men (his life was considered in danger from the tin miners and townsmen whose smuggling operations he had stopped).

On 14 October the regiment began its march to winter quarters at Salisbury, arriving on 6 November. The following spring it marched out on 9 April to do garrison duty at Dover Castle. Here it took over the battalion guns left by the South Devon Militia, which were manned by a corporal and four gunners from the Royal Artillery, and 31 men of the Somersets. The regiment also handed over its unserviceable weapons to the Cinque Ports Volunteers for drill. It remained at Dover until March 1795, when it was relieved by the Lancashire Militia and moved to Canterbury. On 18 May it marched out to join a militia brigade camped on Barham Downs. In August a proportion of the men (nine per company) were given a month's leave to help with the harvest, and a further group to help with threshing in October. On 18 October the camp broke up and the regiment returned for the winter to Canterbury, where a 70-man detachment helped to put out a fire in the town on 29 April 1796. The regiment marched out in early May to its new station at Colchester, Essex, although at first it was quartered in outlying villages because of the Colchester elections. On 25 September it was ordered to Yarmouth, beginning the march on 17 October. Once again, it was held at Norwich until the Yarmouth bye-election was over. Once the regimental headquarters (HQ) was established at Yarmouth, detachments were sent to Lowestoft, Happisburgh, Mundesley and Winterton, which were rotated once a month through the winter. The men at Yarmouth were drilled on the coast defence guns, and the Grenadier and Light Companies were readied to join composite battalions formed in the district.

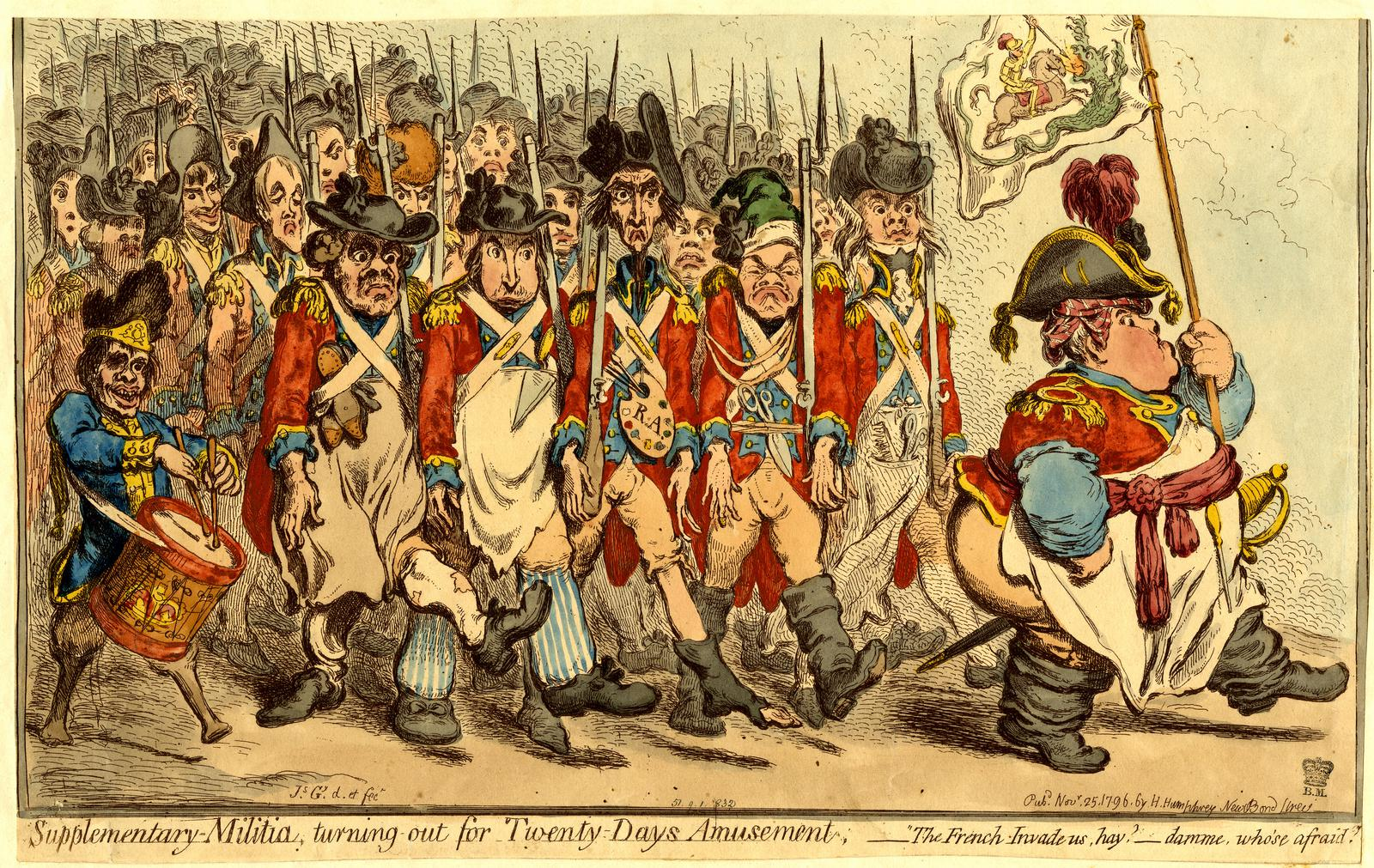
1796 caricature of the Supplementary Militia by James Gillray

In an attempt to have as many men as possible under arms for home defence in order to release regulars, in 1796 the Government created the Supplementary Militia, a compulsory levy of men to be trained for 20 days a year in their spare time, and to be incorporated in the Regular Militia in emergency. Somerset's new quota was fixed at 2960 men, and two additional battalions were embodied from these men as well as bringing the 1st up to full strength. In February 1797 the 1st Somerset sent a training detachment of two officers, six sergeants, two drummers and 15 rank and file to Bath to train the supplementaries.

On 22 May 1797 the 1st Somerset marched from Yarmouth to Ipswich where it formed part of 3rd Brigade in Eastern District. In the autumn it was sent to Plymouth, beginning the march on 15 September, and then was stationed in small detachments across Cornwall. Among its duties were suppression of smuggling and guarding prisoners-of-war, and men were trained on the coast defence batteries. When the supplementaries were embodied as two new regiments ('Eastern' and 'Western', later the 2nd and 3rd Somerset Militia) on 12 March 1798 the 1st Somerset provided a cadre of 3 sergeants, 3 corporals and 6 'well-drilled privates' to each to serve as non-commissioned officers. On 17 March both the 1st Somerset and the 'Somerset Supplementary' regiments were ordered to complete their 'flank' (Grenadier and Light) companies to 100 strong, ready to be incorporated with those from other militia regiments into composite Grenadier and Light battalions. These were formed on 8 May, at Maker and Stanborough respectively, in the coast defences of South West England.

Because of the Rebellion in Ireland, the 10 'battalion' companies volunteered in September to serve in that country but were not required. The regiment marched to Exeter for winter quarters in early October. The Earl of Cork died on 24 October, and Earl Poulett as Lord Lieutenant took personal command of the regiment as colonel. In June and July 1799 the regiment moved to Poole Barracks in Dorset. The invasion threat having receded, the militia was reduced in strength, the surplus men being encouraged to volunteer for the Regular Army: the 1st Somerset provided four officers and 260 other ranks who preferred army life to 'hard labour and poor living' as civilians. The flank companies rejoined the regiment in July, and in August the complete regiment marched to Weymouth to do duty there while King George III was in residence. In October the regiment marched off to Hampshire, first to Fareham, then into Portsmouth for the winter. In November the regiment's establishment was reduced to 600 men in 10 companies. From July to October 1800 the regiment was once again in camp at Weymouth during the Royal Family's residence. It then moved into Weymouth Barracks for the winter, where some of the regimental wives were involved in a riot in the town, and Poulett banned then from barracks and from travelling with the regimental baggage waggons.

In May 1801 the regiment left Weymouth and marched to Gosport. In July the militiamen who had been stood down in 1799 were re-embodied: drafts of 190 men were marched from Taunton and Wells respectively, in order to bring the companies back up to an average strength of 80. On 13 November the regiment began to march back to Somerset, where six companies were stationed at Taunton and the others at Somerton, Langport, Curry Rivel and Wellington. Hostilities ended with the Treaty of Amiens on 27 March 1802, and on 12 April Poulett received the warrant to disembody the Somerset Militia. The 1st Somerset completed the process at Bridgwater on 24 April.

== Napoleonic Wars ==
However, the Peace of Amiens was short-lived and Britain declared war on France once more in May 1803. The 1st and 2nd Somerset Militia had already been embodied in March (the 3rd was not reformed) and were brought up to a higher establishment (1200 men in 12 companies) by supplementaries in June. Both regiments did duty in South West England, where the 1st provided parties to man the fire beacons on the hills. Both regiments had detachments of selected Sharpshooters, and early in November the district commander, Maj-Gen Thomas Grosvenor, held a competition between them, the best marksmen to be awarded a red feather in their cap. (Note: The shooting competition was held at ranges of 200 and 300 yards, suggesting that the sharpshooters used Baker rifles rather than the standard infantry Brown Bess smoothbore musket.)

In March 1804 Regimental HQ was at Tiverton, with detachments at Crediton, Ottery St Mary and Honiton. On 21–22 June it marched to Winchester, then on 3–5 July to Portchester Castle and Gosport (six companies each). However, on 23 August it started out for Weymouth where both the 1st and 2nd Somersets were camped with the 1st Staffordshire Militia in a brigade commanded by Maj-Gen Lord Charles FitzRoy, while the King was in residence at Gloucester Lodge. The regiment remained until October, then spent the winter at Gosport Barracks before returning to Weymouth from July to October 1805. This time the 1st and 2nd Somersets were brigaded with the 1st Royal Lancashire and the North Yorkshire Militia. On 1 September the 1st Somersets consisted of 873 men in 10 companies under the command of Lt-Col John Leigh.

Sir Charles Bampfylde, 5th Baronet, MP, was promoted to lieutenant-colonel on 27 April 1805. That summer the militia were encouraged to volunteer for the regulars, and the establishment of the regiment was reduced to 886 men in 10 companies. When the camp at Weymouth broke up, the regiment left on 9 October and marched to join a brigade at Lewes in East Sussex, where it was stationed at Silverhill with the 2nd Somersets. In January 1806 the regiment volunteered for service in Ireland, but the offer was again turned down. The following June it moved to Winchelsea and Rye, the Rye portion being camped near Cliff End. It remained in Sussex until October 1807, when it marched to Portsmouth, arriving on 3 November and being divided between Portsea Barracks and Hilsea Barracks. That autumn 298 men had volunteered for the regulars.

To counter the declining numbers of Volunteers, the government established the Local Militia in 1808. These were part-time and only to be used in their home districts. Somerset's Local Militia quota was assessed at over 6000 men, organised into seven regiments, and many of the remaining Volunteer units transferred en masse to the Local Militia. Instructors were provided by the Regular Militia. In March 1808 the 1st Somersets marched to Bristol, arriving in early April, and then a 100-man detachment undertook a further 10-day march to Milford Haven. That summer Lt-Col Bampfylde volunteered the regiment for overseas service, this time to Spain (where the Peninsular War was in progress) or any part of Europe, but this was politely turned down.

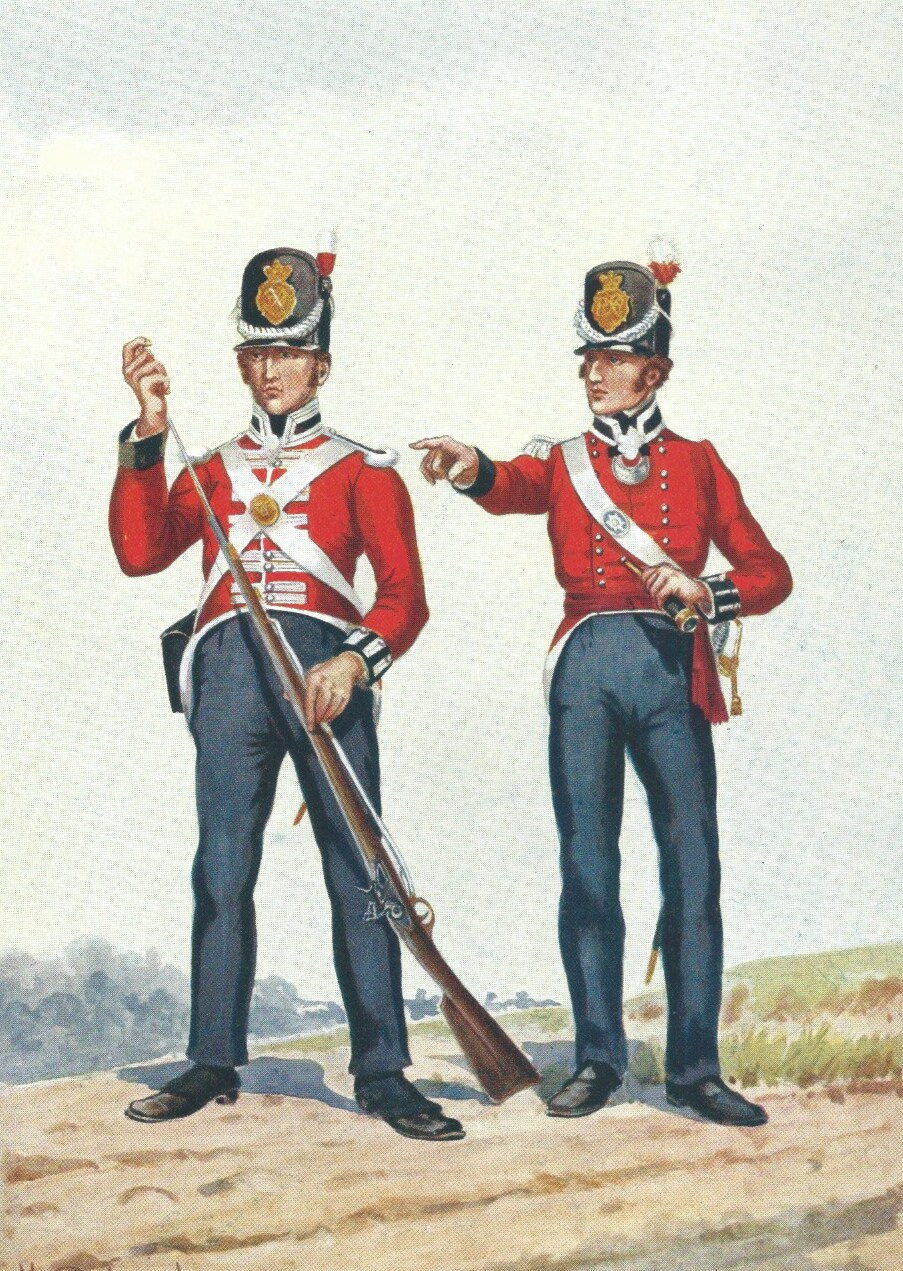
A Somerset Militia private and lieutenant between 1812 and 1816

In February 1809 a quarrel took place between Majors John Joliffe and Sir William Yea, 2nd Baronet; although the two men made it up, the regimental adjutant and four captains considered that they should have fought a Duel, and refused to associate with the two majors. A court of inquiry honourably acquitted the two majors but called for a Court-martial on the five complainants. The court-martial revealed that Peculation and other abuses were rife within the regiment, which Maj Yea had tried to halt, in conflict with the adjutant, Capt Graves, who allowed them to continue. The court-martial found the five officers guilty and dismissed them from the service (in view of his long service the adjutant's sentence was commuted to suspension). Lieutenant-Col Bampfylde also resigned, and Lt-Col John Hulton was transferred in from the West Somerset Local Militia to replace him. Sir William Yea also resigned later that year, but Maj Joliffe continued with the regiment for many years.

On 8 July 1809 the regiment began a move back to Exeter, marching into Berry Head Barracks on 20 July. During the summer men were loaned out to help with the harvest. In October it marched back to Plymouth, where duties included guarding prisoners-of-war in the hulks moored in the Hamoaze and at Dartmoor Prison at Princetown. It also supplied a training detachment to the Polden Hill Local Militia at Bridgwater. The 1st Somerset continued these duties in the Plymouth Garrison until April 1813. It then moved into Maker Barracks, before marching into Cornwall in May, with Regimental HQ at Pendennis Castle. There was still trouble among the officers: a court-martial was held on Lt Thomas Hughes for Horsewhipping Lt J.T.B. Notley, at which Hughes was found guilty and dismissed the service (Notley resigned). There was also a duel between Capt Jeremiah Perry and Lt Thomas Leader, in which Perry was wounded and Leader and the seconds fled to avoid the law.

=== Ireland ===
An Act of Parliament in 1811 permitted militia regiments to volunteer for periods of two years' service in Ireland. The 1st Somerset volunteered, and on 29 December 1813 the regiment embarked at Plymouth bound for Cork under the command of Maj William Sandford. However, the seven transports carrying the regiment were scattered by bad weather: most of it landed at Monkstown on 9 January 1814, but some had been driven into Kinsale and Baltimore. The regiment then marched on 10 January for Kilkenny, where it remained until September. While there it had to deal with serious rioting on St Patrick's Day, in which one rioter was killed.

=== Dartmoor ===
Napoleon abdicated in April 1814 and it appeared that the wars were over. In September the English militia regiments in Ireland were ordered back to their home counties to be disembodied. The 1st Somerset assembled at Cork on 24 September and sailed next day on three transports, the Portland (4 companies), Prince of Wales (4) and Hannah (2). After sailing via the Isles of Scilly the transports finally reached Plymouth on 11 October. The regiment set off to Taunton to be disembodied, the men marching in their breeches and leggings, their trousers being worn out. On arrival at Taunton they were told that the order to disembody had been countermanded. This caused much disappointment, and 200 of the men signed a petition to the Commander-in-Chief asking to be disembodied. Nevertheless, on 31 October they were marched back to Dartmoor to relieve two regular battalions. The prison now housed American prisoners from the continuing War of 1812, the French having been repatriated. In December two Privates of the regiment were commended for detecting four prisoners attempting to escape.

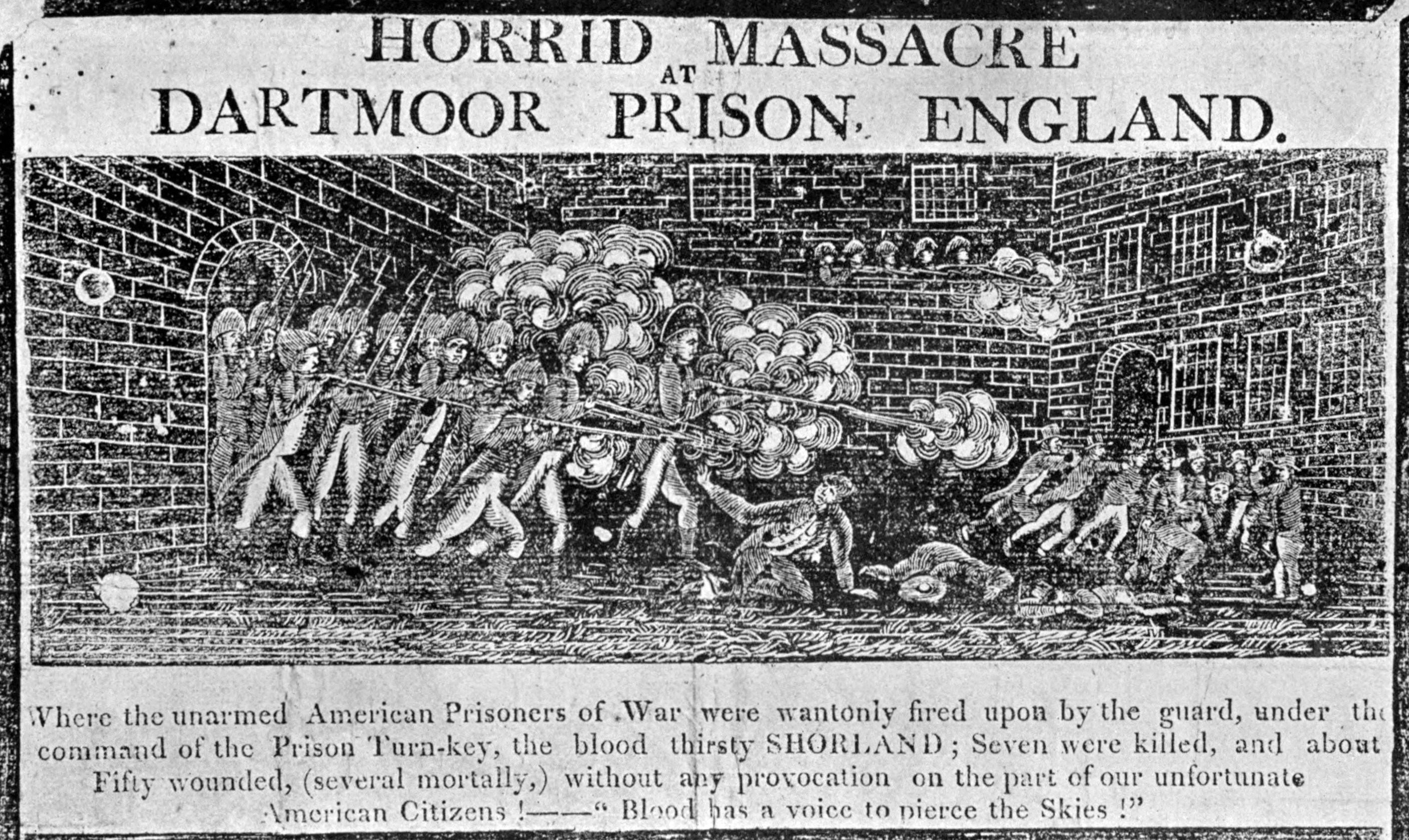
American propaganda engraving of the 1815 Dartmoor riot

In January 1815 the 1st Somerset were relieved and went to Frankfort Barracks in Plymouth, returning to Dartmoor for a new tour of duty on 3 March. By now a peace treaty (the Treaty of Ghent) had been signed but US ships had not yet arrived to repatriate the prisoners-of-war. The American prisoners (mainly seamen) were turbulent, wanting to go home but fearful of being pressganged onto US warships for the Second Barbary War. On 6 April some of them made a small breach in the barrack wall and the alarm was sounded, calling out the guard (1st Somerset and Derbyshire Militia). On this a crowd of prisoners filled the inner courtyard and surged towards the gates. The guard blocked the way but the crowd pressed against them, one attempting to seize a militiaman's musket, at which the man fired. Firing then became general, allegedly ordered by the prison governor, although the militia claimed that most of their shots went over the prisoners' heads. Major Joliffe with the Grenadier Company of the 1st Somerset arrived from the barracks and halted the firing. By the time the riot was quelled five prisoners had been killed and 34 wounded (according to the initial inquiry). At the subsequent coroner's inquest a jury of Dartmoor famers brought in a verdict of 'justifiable homicide'. A later commission of inquiry found the evidence contradictory.

Early in 1815 Napoleon returned from Elba, sparking off the short Waterloo campaign. Some of the militia regiments that had been disembodied were called out again, and those like the 1st Somerset that were still embodied continued in service. However, the volunteers and substitutes who had completed their five years' service were progressively demobilised during the summer of 1815. The regiment went into Marlborough Square Barracks at Plymouth Dock in October and remained there until the beginning of 1816. On 10 January instructions were received for the regiment to disembody, and on 22 January it marched out, reaching Taunton on 27 January. Disembodiment was completed on 31 January.

== Long peace ==
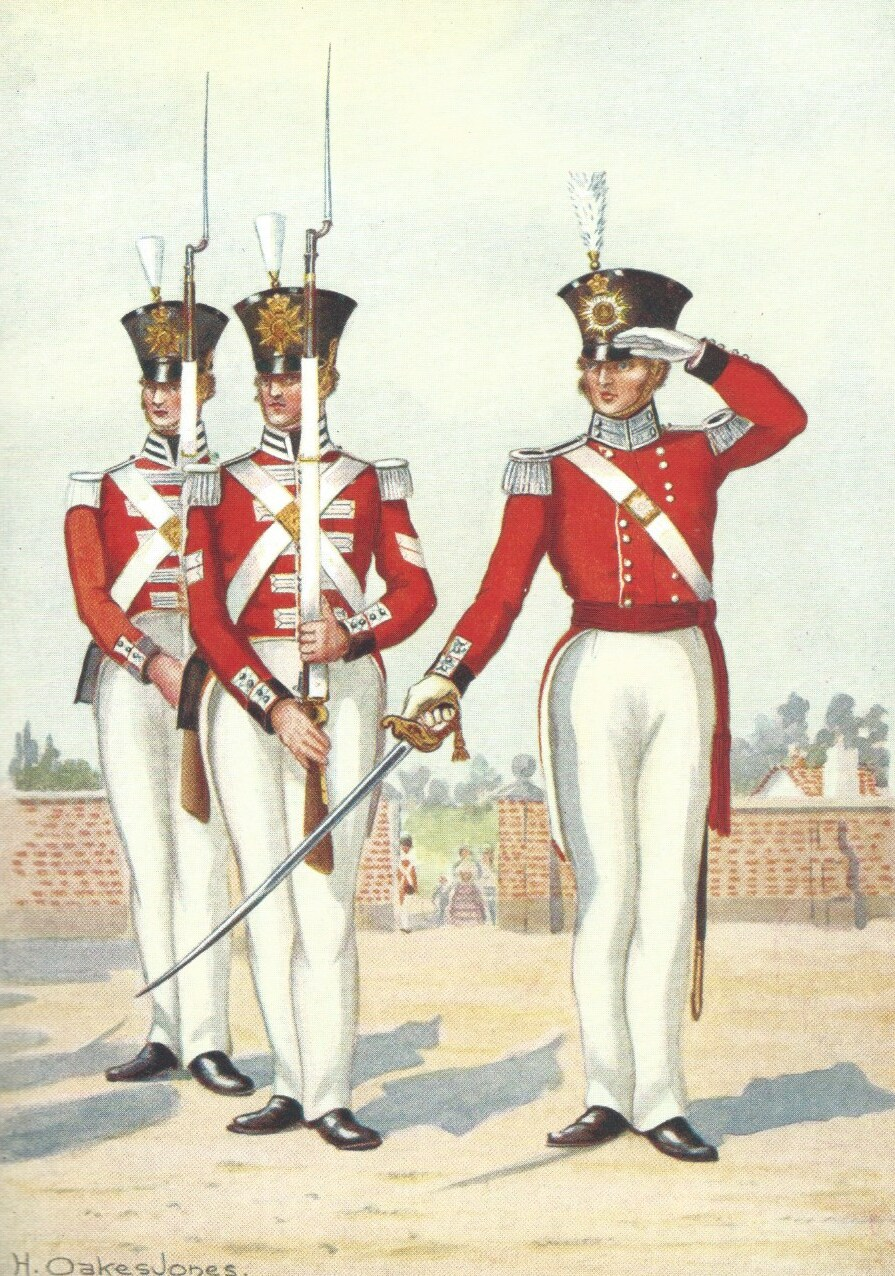
A private, corporal and captain of the Somerset Militia in 1831

After Waterloo there was another long peace. Although officers continued to be commissioned into the militia, and ballots were still held until 1831, the regiments were rarely assembled for training (the 1st Somerset only in 1820, 1821, 1825 and 1831). The permanent staffs of sergeants and drummers were progressively reduced.

On the death of the 4th Earl Poulett in 1819, his eldest son, John Poulett, Viscount Hinton, succeeded to the earldom. He had been colonel of the 2nd Somerset Militia since 1804, but transferred to replace his father as colonel of the 1st. Major Joliffe (of the 1809 quarrel and Dartmoor riot) was promoted to lt-col in 1839.

== 1852 Reforms ==
The Militia of the United Kingdom was revived by the Militia Act 1852, enacted during a renewed period of international tension. As before, units were raised and administered on a county basis, and filled by voluntary enlistment (although conscription by means of the Militia Ballot might be used if the counties failed to meet their quotas). Training was for 56 days on enlistment, then for 21–28 days per year, during which the men received full army pay. Under the Act, militia units could be embodied by Royal Proclamation for full-time home defence service in three circumstances:

1. 'Whenever a state of war exists between Her Majesty and any foreign power'.
2. 'In all cases of invasion or upon imminent danger thereof'.
3. 'In all cases of rebellion or insurrection'.

The 5th Earl Poulett was still colonel when the 1st Somerset Militia was revived in 1852. He resigned, and his eldest son Vere, Viscount Hinton, formerly an Ensign in the 68th Foot and Major of the 1st Somerset Militia since 1846, was appointed colonel in his place. The other elderly officers also retired, and fresh ones were commissioned, including Lt-Col Richard Phipps from the Regular Army. The regiment began recruiting on 21 September 1852 and by 19 November it had enlisted 606 men. It carried out its first training in May 1853 at Taunton.

=== Crimean War and after ===
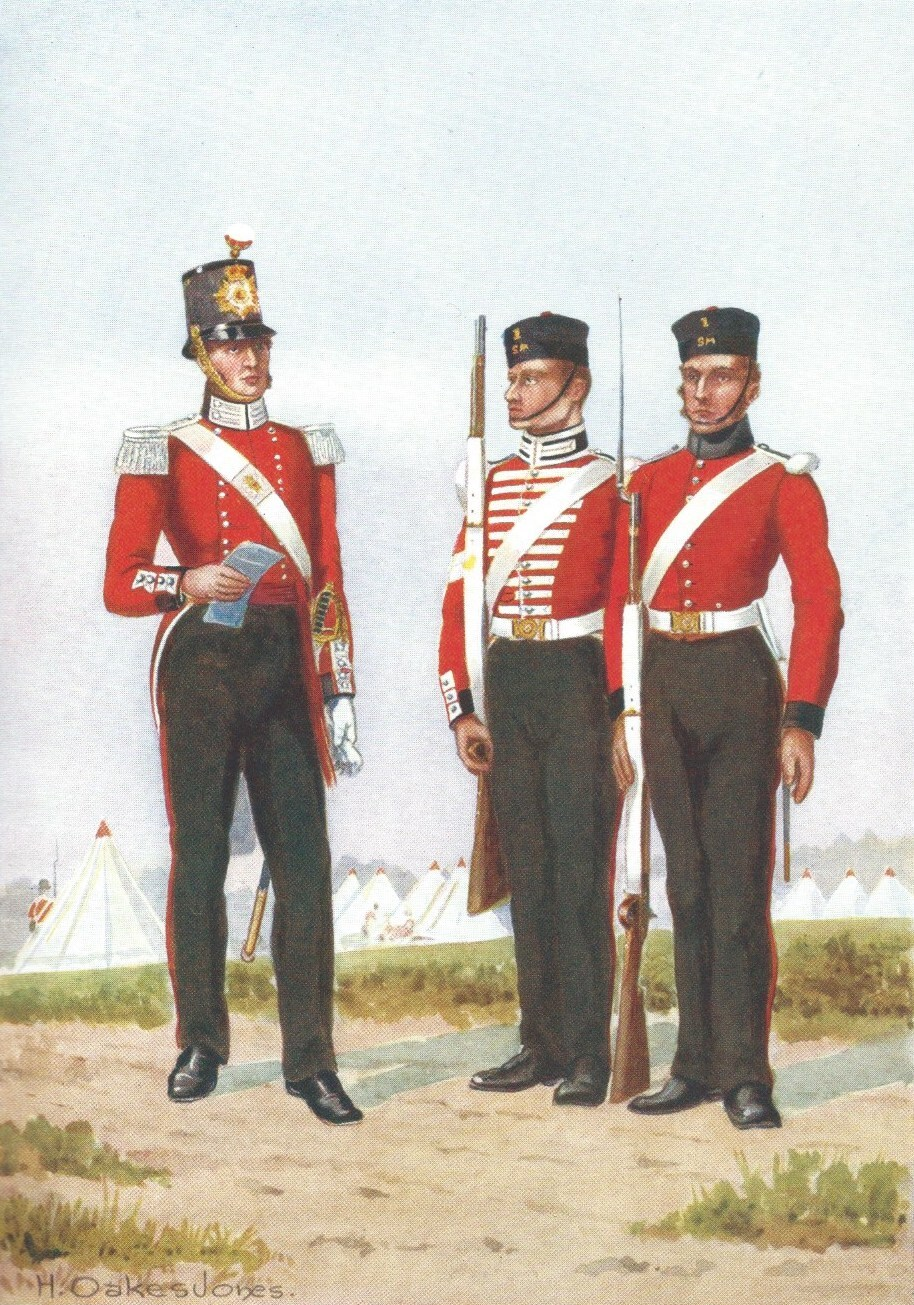
A captain, corporal and private of the Somerset Militia in 1854

War having broken out with Russia in 1854 and an expeditionary force sent to the Crimea, the militia began to be called out for home defence. The 1st Somersets were embodied on 2 May and went to Devonport. The regiment moved back to Taunton on 31 March 1855, then on 7 February 1856 it went to Aldershot Camp. The Crimean War ended in March that year, and the regiment left Aldershot for Taunton on 6 June, completing its disembodiment on 12 June.

After the death of Viscount Hinton on 28 August 1857, Charles Kemeys-Tynte junior, a former officer in the Grenadier Guards and 11th Hussars, was appointed colonel (his father, also Charles Kemeys-Tynte, was colonel of the Royal Glamorgan Light Infantry Militia). However, the position of colonel in the militia was abolished and he became the regiment's first Honorary Colonel, with Lt-Col Phipps as Lt-Col Commandant.

The 1st Somerset Militia carried out annual training (21 or 27 days) at Taunton each year from 1858. The Militia Reserve introduced in 1867 consisted of present and former militiamen who undertook to serve overseas in case of war. In 1871 the militia came under the War Office rather than their county lords lieutenant. Around a third of the recruits and many young officers went on to join the regular army.

== Cardwell Reforms ==
Under the 'Localisation of the Forces' scheme introduced by the Cardwell Reforms of 1872, militia regiments were brigaded with their local regular and Volunteer battalions. Sub-District No 36 (Somersetshire) was formed at Taunton:

- 1st & 2nd Battalions, 13th (1st Somerset) (Prince Albert's Light Infantry) Regiment of Foot
- 1st Somerset Militia
- 2nd Somerset Militia
- 1st-3rd Administrative Battalions, Somerset Rifle Volunteers

The sub-districts were to establish a brigade depot for their linked battalions, but it was not until 1879–81 that Jellalabad Barracks was built as the depot at Taunton. The 1st and 2nd Somerset Militia had adopted Leigh Camp near Taunton as their training ground in 1873. In that year, after preliminary raining for recruits, the 1st Somerset took part in brigade manoeuvres on Dartmoor with the 1st Devon and 2nd Royal Tower Hamlets Militia, though bad weather meant that opposing units often failed to locate each other in the moorland mists. On 1 November 1875 the 1st Somerset Militia was redesignated the 1st Somerset Light Infantry Militia.

Following the Cardwell Reforms a mobilisation scheme began to appear in the Army List from December 1875. This assigned regular and militia units to places in an order of battle of corps, divisions and brigades for the 'Active Army', even though these formations were entirely theoretical, with no staff or services assigned. The 'West Somerset' (Note: By 1875 the regiment was sometimes unofficially referred to (even in the Army List) as the West Somerset Militia, a title formerly used by the Supplementary Militia regiment that became the 3rd Somerset Militia.) and 2nd Somerset Militia were both assigned to 1st Brigade of 3rd Division, IV Corps in Ireland. On 3 April 1878 the Militia Reserve was called out to reinforce the Regular Army during the international crisis over the Russo-Turkish War.

== Somerset Light Infantry ==
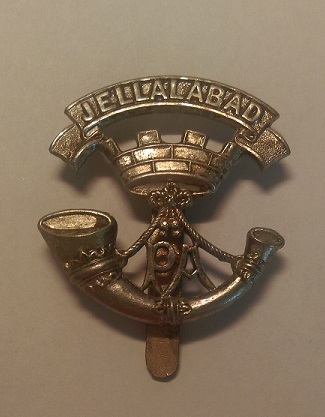
The Somerset Light Infantry's cap badge

The Childers Reforms took Cardwell's reforms further, with the linked battalions forming single regiments. From 1 July 1881 the 13th Foot became 'Prince Albert's (Somersetshire Light Infantry)', or more familiarly the Somerset Light Infantry (SLI), with the 1st and 2nd Somerset Light Infantry Militia as its 3rd and 4th Battalions.

The militia were issued with the Martini–Henry rifle in 1882, and the Lee–Metford in 1895. The increased range and penetration of these new weapons meant that the rifle range at Leigh Camp was no longer safe and a new one was constructed at Orchard Portman. In 1896 and 1897 the 3rd Bn carried out its annual training there as well, and Leigh Camp was used for the last time in 1898. In 1899 the battalion camped at Perham Down on Salisbury Plain and took part in the army's annual manoeuvres that year.

=== Second Boer War ===
At the start of the Second Boer War 1899, most regular army battalions were sent to South Africa, the Militia Reserve was mobilised to reinforce them, and many militia units were called out to replace them for home defence. The 3rd SLI were embodied on 15 May 1900 and went to Plymouth the same night, going into camp at Tregantle. The battalion was issued with a Maxim gun on embodiment. Although the 3rd Bn did not serve overseas, a number of officers volunteered to serve in South Africa, some with the 4th Bn. On 23 July 1900 the battalion moved into North Raglan Barracks, Devonport, where it remained until it was disembodied at Taunton on 4 December.

== Special Reserve ==
After the Boer War, there were moves to reform the Auxiliary Forces (militia, yeomanry and volunteers) to take their place in the six army corps proposed by St John Brodrick as Secretary of State for War. However, little of Brodrick's scheme was carried out. The 3rd Bn SLI continued annual training at: Bulford Camp, Salisbury Plain (1902); Maker Heights and Tregantle ranges (1903); recruit training and musketry at Whitchurch, Bristol, then by steamboat to Minehead for training at North Hill (1904); Honiton (1905–8).

Under the sweeping Haldane Reforms of 1908, the militia was replaced by the Special Reserve (SR), a semi-professional force similar to the previous militia reserve, whose role was to provide reinforcement drafts for regular units serving overseas in wartime. Simultaneously the volunteers and yeomanry became the Territorial Force (TF). The 3rd (1st Somerset Militia) Bn, SLI, became the 3rd (Reserve) Battalion, SLI, in the SR on 7 June 1908. The 4th (2nd Somerset Militia) Bn was disbanded, but a number of officers and men transferred to the 3rd Bn.

The 3rd Bn carried out its annual training at: Willsworthy, Dartmoor (1909); Bulford (1910); Tregantle (1911); Kingsdown near Bath (1912); Scraesdon Fort, Plymouth (1913); Perham Down (1914).

== World War I ==
=== 3rd (Reserve) Battalion ===
On the outbreak of World War I the battalion was embodied at Taunton on 4 August 1914 under the command of Lt-Col A. Llewellyn. On 8 August went to its war station at Devonport Dockyard where it relieved the two TF battalions of the SLI, who had proceeded there direct from their annual training on Salisbury Plain. The 3rd Bn was stationed at Bull Point and the forts surrounding Plymouth. It was now confirmed that the 3rd Bn was not destined to go overseas but would remain in the UK as a draft-finding unit. It equipped and prepared drafts of Regular Reservists, Special Reservists, and later new recruits for the regular battalions serving overseas (primarily the 1st Bn on the Western Front, the 2nd Bn remaining in India for the whole of the war). The 3rd Bn despatched its first draft on 26 August. The 9th (Reserve) Bn (see below) was formed alongside it in the Plymouth Garrison on 23 September to supply drafts to the 'Kitchener's Army' battalions of the SLI that were being raised. Lieutenant-Col A.G.A. Jerrard took over command of the 3rd Bn on 28 January 1917.

The 3rd Bn remained at Devonport until 17 November 1917 when it crossed to Northern Ireland, being stationed at Derry until March 1918, then moved to Holywood Barracks, near Belfast until the end of the war. The TF's 4th Reserve Bn was disbanded in November 1918 and its personnel posted to the 3rd Bn, bringing its strength up to over 2000 as the war ended. During the war it had sent about 700 officers and 13,000 other ranks overseas. The 3rd Bn was disembodied on 27 September 1919 when the remaining personnel were transferred to the 1st Bn SLI.

=== 9th (Reserve) Battalion ===
After Lord Kitchener issued his call for volunteers in August 1914, the battalions of the 1st, 2nd and 3rd New Armies ('K1', 'K2' and 'K3' of 'Kitchener's Army') were quickly formed at the regimental depots. The SR battalions also swelled with new recruits and were soon well above their establishment strength. On 8 October 1914 each SR battalion was ordered to use the surplus to form a service battalion of the 4th New Army ('K4'). Accordingly, the 3rd (Reserve) Bn at Devonport formed the 9th (Service) Bn Somerset Light Infantry in October. It was to be part of 98th Brigade in 33rd Division. In December 1914 it went to St Austell. In April 1915 the War Office decided to convert the K4 battalions into 2nd Reserve units, providing drafts for the K1–K3 battalions in the same way that the SR was doing for the Regular battalions. The Somerset LI battalion became 9th (Reserve) Battalion, at Wareham, Dorset, in 10th Reserve Brigade, where it trained drafts for the 6th, 7th and 8th (Service) Bns SLI. On 1 September 1916 the 2nd Reserve battalions were transferred to the Training Reserve (TR) and the battalion was redesignated 45th Training Reserve Bn, still in 10th Reserve Bde. The training staff retained their SLI badges. The battalion was finally disbanded on 21 January 1918 at Perham Down Camp on Salisbury Plain.

=== Postwar ===
The SR resumed its old title of Militia in 1921 but like most militia units the 3rd SLI remained in abeyance after World War I. By the outbreak of World War II in 1939, no officers remained listed for the battalion. The Militia was formally disbanded in April 1953.

== Commanders ==
Regimental and battalion commanders included:

- Col John Poulett, 2nd Earl Poulett, Lord Lieutenant of Somerset, assumed command 22 March 1759, died 5 November 1764
- Lt-Col John Helliar, acting 1764–7
- Col Coplestone Warre Bampfylde, promoted 2 June 1767
- Col Edmund Boyle, 7th Earl of Cork, promoted 23 November 1784, died 30 May 1798
- Col John Poulett, 4th Earl Poulett, Lord Lieutenant of Somerset, assumed command 25 October 1798 (also Col East Devon Militia) died 14 January 1819
- Col John Poulett, 5th Earl Poulett, transferred from command of 2nd Somerset Militia 23 February 1819, retired 1852
- Col Vere Poulett, Viscount Hinton (formerly 68th Foot), promoted 18 October 1852, died 29 August 1857
- Lt-Col Commandant Richard Phipps (Brevet colonel in the army)
- Lt-Col Thomas Hussey, promoted 11 November 1874
- Lt-Col Henry Cornish Henley, promoted 26 February 1879, retired 9 October 1897
- Lt-Col the Hon Henry Gore-Langton (formerly 72nd Foot), promoted 20 October 1897
- Lt-Col Hastings Hicks, promoted 5 June 1901
- Lt-Col A. Llewellyn (formerly 4th (2nd Somerset Militia) Bn), promoted 28 January 1911
- Lt-Col A.G.A. Jerrard, CBE, (formerly 4th Dragoon Guards), promoted 28 January 1917

=== Honorary Colonels ===
The following officers served as Honorary Colonel:

- Col Charles Kemeys-Tynte (formerly Grenadier Guards and 11th Hussars), appointed 20 October 1857, died 10 January 1891
- Col Henry Cornish Henley, former CO, appointed 17 November 1897; reappointed to SR 23 August 1908
- Col Hastings Hicks, former CO, appointed 8 August 1919, died March 1928

== Heritage and ceremonial ==
=== Uniforms and insignia ===
From 1759 the Somerset Militia wore red uniforms with black facings – black being the livery colour of Earl Poulett, the Lord Lieutenant of Somerset and colonel of the 1st Somersets. The Regimental Colour would also have been black, displaying the Poulett coat of arms (when the original colours were replaced in 1762 Poulett was dissatisfied with the replacements and had new ones made at his own expense). After the Earl of Cork took command in 1784 he changed the facings to lemon yellow (yellow facings had been worn by the Somerset Militia at the time of the Monmouth Rebellion). By about 1811 the 1st Somersets reverted to black velvet facings. When the Somerset Militia became part of the SLI they lost their familiar black facings and adopted the blue that had been awarded to the SLI when they became 'Prince Albert's' and hence a Royal regiment in 1842. In 1904, C Company became the first part of the battalion to adopt khaki service dress, which was worn by the whole battalion at the 1905 training.

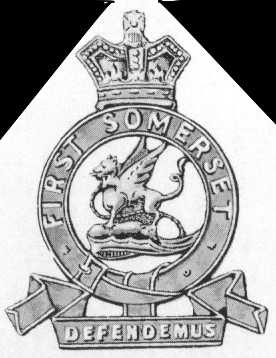
Glengarry badge of the 1st Somerset Militia

The heraldic crest of the Duke of Monmouth was awarded to the Yellow Regiment of the Somerset Militia as a badge after his capture following the Battle of Sedgemoor: 'Upon a Chapeau gules turned up ermine, a Dragon passant or gorged (collared) with a Crown having a Chain gules'. The 1st Somerset Militia retained the 'chapeau' or 'Cap of maintenance' surmounted by the chained dragon as its badge. The regiment also adopted the motto of Taunton, Defendemus ('We will defend'). The Glengarry cap badge of 1874–1880 has the cap and dragon within a crowned garter inscribed 'FIRST SOMERSET" with the motto on a scroll underneath.

About 1800–37 the officers' shoulder-belt plate carried an eight-pointed cut star, in the centre of which was a crown surrounded by a garter inscribed 'DEFENDEMUS'. By 1840 the design had changed to have the Royal cypher 'VR' inside the garter with the crown above; this was carried on both the shoulder-belt plate and the Shako plate. From 1861 to 1880 the garter was inscribed '1st SOMERSET' and 'DEFENDEMUS' was on a scroll beneath.

Until 1855 the buttons had the figure '1' with crown above and 'SOMERSET REGT.' beneath. When the tunic was introduced in 1855 this changed to 'FIRST SOMERSET' with the crown above. From 1861 the button was altered to the crowned royal cypher above the title 'FIRST SOMERSET REGIMENT'.

After it became part of the SLI in 1881, the battalion wore the insignia of that regiment, including the cap badge of a light infantry bugle-horn beneath a Mural crown surmounted by a scroll bearing the Battle honour 'JELLALABAD'.

=== Precedence ===
In 1759 it was ordered that militia regiments on service were to take precedence from the date of their arrival in camp. In 1760 this was altered to a system of drawing lots where regiments did duty together. During the War of American Independence the counties were given an order of precedence determined by ballot each year. For the Somerset Militia the positions were:

- 3rd on 1 June 1778
- 20th on12 May 1779
- 29th on 6 May 1780
- 21st on 28 April 1781
- 21st on 7 May 1782

The militia order of precedence balloted for in 1793 (Somerset was 40th) remained in force throughout the French Revolutionary War: this covered all the regiments in the county. Another ballot for precedence took place in 1803 at the start of the Napoleonic War and remained in force until 1833: Somerset was 9th. In 1833 the King drew the lots for individual regiments and the resulting list continued in force with minor amendments until the end of the militia. The regiments raised before the peace of 1763 took the first 47 places and the 1st Somerset became 16th. Most regiments took little notice of the numeral.

== See also ==
- Militia (Great Britain)
- Militia (United Kingdom)
- Special Reserve
- Somerset Light Infantry
- 2nd Somerset Militia
