= 2nd Somerset Militia =

1st Somerset Militia 4th Battalion, Somerset Light Infantry
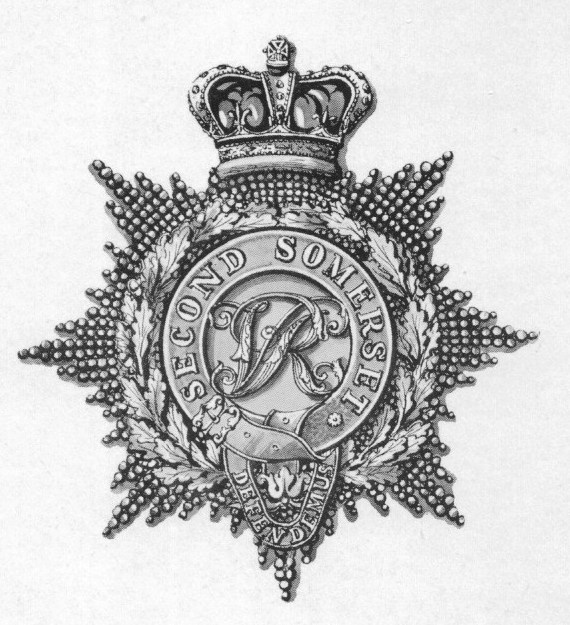
- Officers' shako plate 1870
- Active: 22 March 1759–1763, 1797–31 August 1908
- Country: Kingdom of Great Britain (1759–1800); United Kingdom (1801–1908)
- Branch: Militia
- Role: Infantry
- Size: 1 Battalion
- Part of: Somerset Light Infantry
- Garrison/HQ: Bath; Jellalabad Barracks, Taunton
- Engagements: Second Boer War

Commanders
- Notable commanders: Sir Charles Kemys Tynte, 5th Baronet

The 2nd Somerset Militia was an auxiliary (Note: It is incorrect to describe the British Militia as 'irregular': throughout their history they were equipped and trained exactly like the line regiments of the regular army, and once embodied in time of war they were fulltime professional soldiers for the duration of their enlistment.) military regiment in the county of Somerset in South West England. First organised during the Seven Years' War it was reformed at the start of the French Revolutionary War and continued on internal security and home defence duties in all of Britain's major wars. It later became a battalion of the Somerset Light Infantry and served in South Africa during the Second Boer War, but was disbanded in 1908.

== Background ==
The universal obligation to military service in the Shire levy was long established in England and its legal basis was updated by two acts of 1557 (4 & 5 Ph. & M. cc. 2 and 3), which placed selected men, the 'trained bands', under the command of Lords Lieutenant appointed by the monarch. This is seen as the starting date for the organised county militia in England. It was an important element in the country's defence at the time of the Spanish Armada in the 1580s, and control of the militia was one of the areas of dispute between King Charles I and Parliament that led to the English Civil War. The Somerset Trained Bands were active in local skirmishes and sieges during the early part of the civil war, and later in controlling the country under the Commonwealth and Protectorate. The English militia was re-established under local control in 1662 after the Restoration of the monarchy, and the Somerset Militia played a prominent part in the Monmouth Rebellion of 1685. However, after the Peace of Utrecht in 1715 the militia was allowed to decline.

== Seven Years' War ==
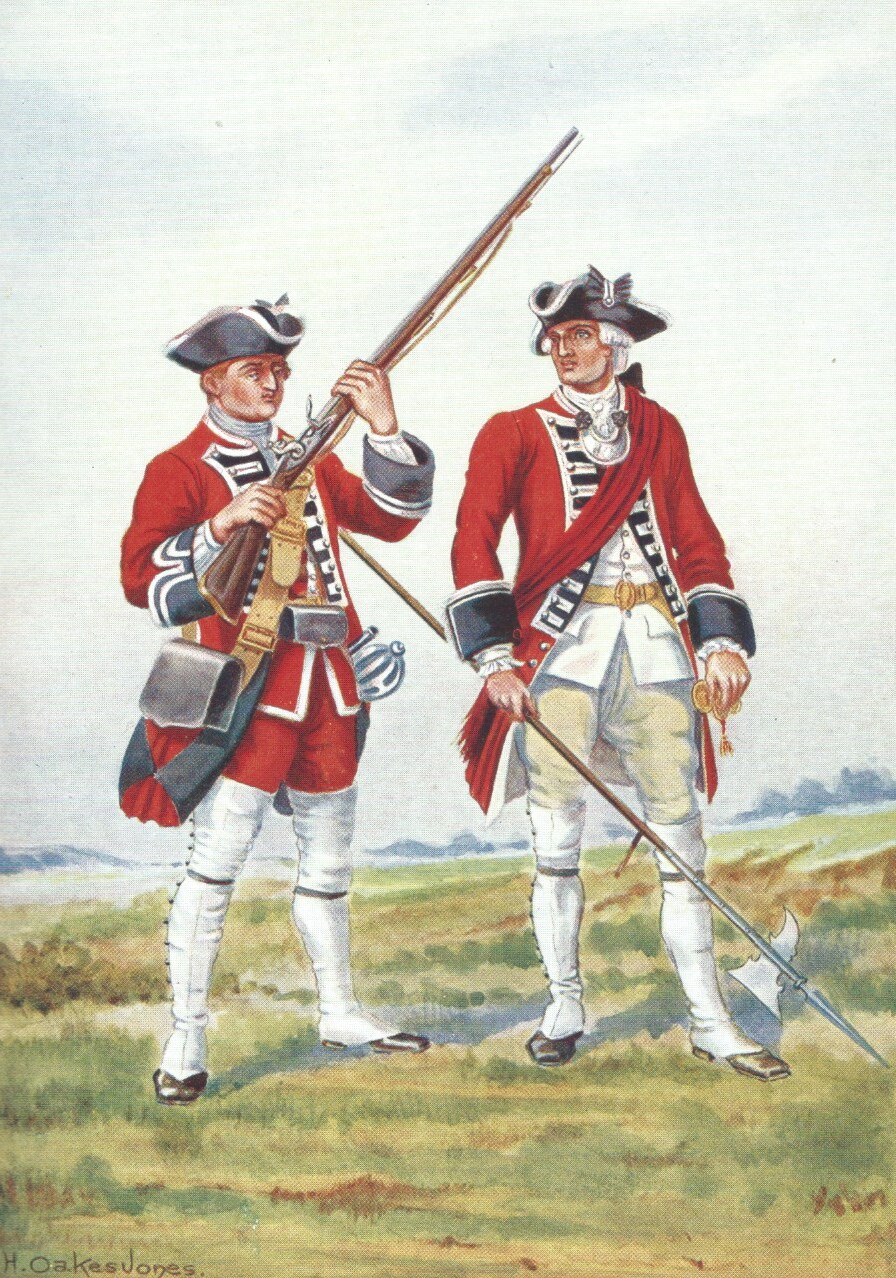
A private and sergeant of the Somerset Militia in 1759

Under threat of French invasion during the Seven Years' War a series of Militia Acts from 1757 reorganised the county militia regiments, the men being conscripted by means of parish ballots (paid substitutes were permitted) to serve for three years. In peacetime they assembled for 28 days' annual training. There was a property qualification for officers, who were commissioned by the lord lieutenant. An adjutant and drill sergeants were to be provided to each regiment from the Regular Army, and arms and accoutrements would be supplied when the county had secured 60 per cent of its quota of recruits.

Somerset's quota was set at 840 men in two regiments, each of seven companies. The Lord Lieutenant of Somerset, Earl Poulett, was an enthusiast for the militia, but even he was slow to act, finding the Somerset gentry averse, and the 'common people outrageously against it' for fear of being 'Digby'd abroad' (Lord Digby had recently raised a regular regiment in Somerset and Dorset for home service but the men had been forcibly sent overseas). In 1758 Poulett tried to recruit officers, but the first lieutenancy meeting was a failure with only eight persons putting themselves forward out of 40 required. Poulett then began a publicity campaign, giving a rousing speech and having copies of its circulated. He proposed taking the colonelcy of both regiments himself, and appointed the other senior officers from across the political spectrum. By January 1759 he had obtained almost all the officers and balloting and enrolment of the other ranks began. The 1st Somerset Militia was formed at Taunton, the 2nd Somerset Militia at Bath, and both received their arms on 22 March 1759.

The 1st and 2nd Somerset Militia were both embodied for fulltime service on 3 July 1759. Despite the delays, Somerset was still one of the earliest counties to complete its militia, but the lack of experience in any county at this date led to problems over pay and administration. The counties were offered the help of a regular officer, but Poulett refused this, to reassure his men that they were not being conscripted into the regulars. The Somerset Militia also produced its own simplified drill book.

The 2nd Somerset Militia was embodied under the command of Colonel Sir Charles Kemys Tynte, 5th Baronet, MP for Somerset. The adjutant was Lieutenant Daniel Daniel of the 13th Foot, who had been wounded at the Battle of Fontenoy and had been at the Battle of Culloden. The day after embodiment the regiment was ordered to march to Bideford in Devon to come under the command of Major-General Duroure. It set off from Bath on 16 July. Two years later, in July 1761, it was serving at Godalming in Surrey. Poulett continued to have difficulties over officers for the Somerset Militia: after the death of King George II and the accession of George III in 1760 their commissions were continued by royal proclamation. Some officers chose to regard them as new commissions outside the Militia Act and retired in 1761. While balloting was held in Somerset in November 1761 to replace the time-expired men in the ranks, the lieutenancy published advertisements in December seeking candidates for junior officers. After serving in home defence for most of the war, the regiment was ordered to disembody on 30 December 1762, shortly before hostilities were ended by the Treaty of Paris. The officers and men of the Somersets left so quickly that it was difficult to settle up the regimental accounts. In 1763 the disembodied Somerset militia regiments were reorganised into a single regiment of 12 companies, and the 2nd Somerset Militia ceased to exist for the next 35 years, while the 1st served during the War of American Independence.

== French Revolutionary Wars ==
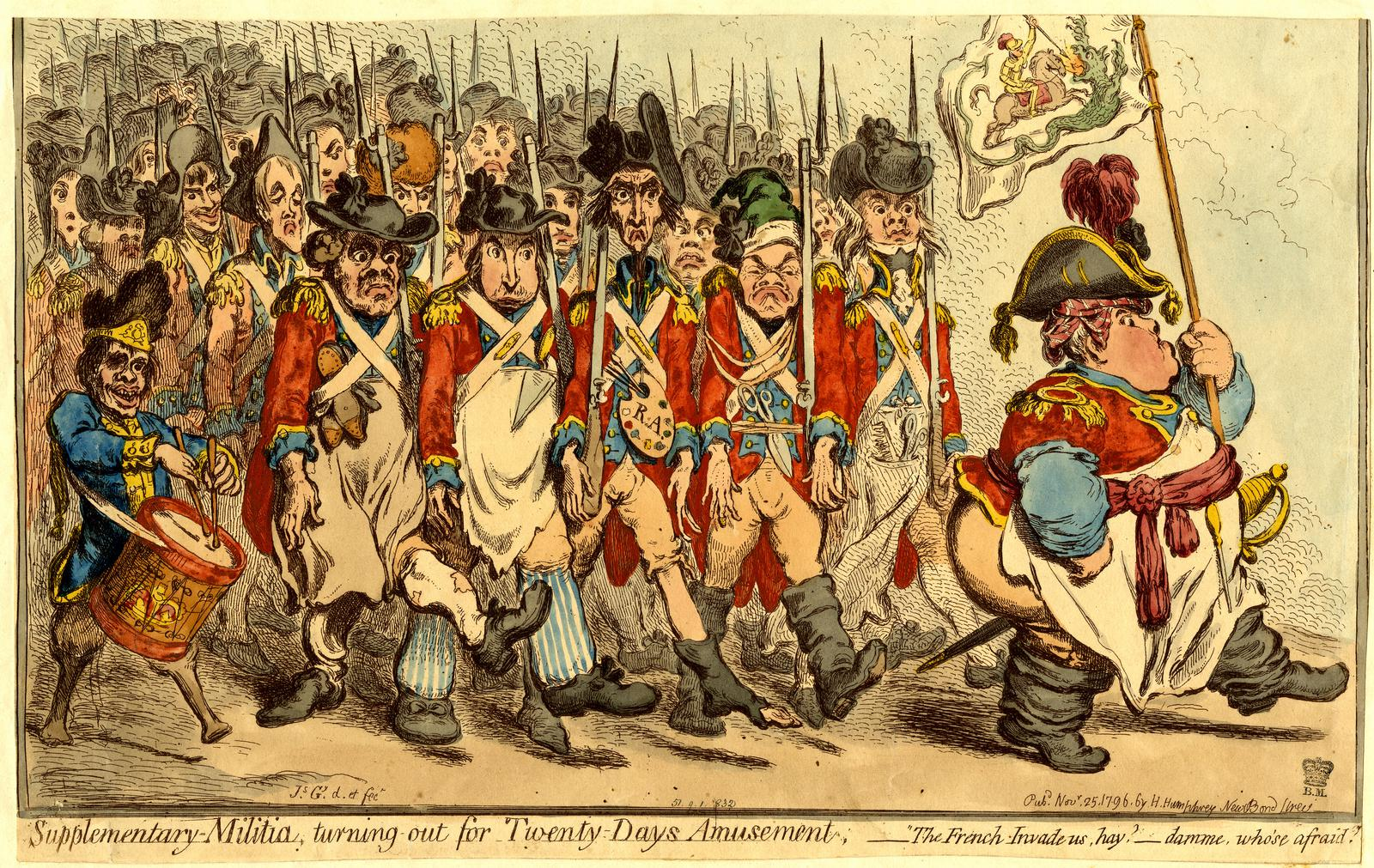
1796 caricature of the Supplementary Militia by James Gillray

The militia was already being embodied when Revolutionary France declared war on Britain on 1 February 1793 and the Somerset Militia took up its usual home defence and garrison duties. In an attempt to have as many men as possible under arms for home defence to release regulars, in 1796 the Government created the Supplementary Militia, a compulsory levy of men to be trained for 20 days a year in their spare time, and to be incorporated in the Regular Militia in emergency. Somerset's new quota was fixed at 2960 men, and two additional battalions were formed from these men in 1797 as well as bringing the 1st Somerset Militia up to full strength. The new battalions were the Eastern Battalion at Bath, and the Western Battalion at Taunton; later they were designated the 2nd and 3rd Somerset Militia. On 24 February 1797 the 1st Somerset Militia sent a detachment of three officers, six sergeants, two drummer and 15 rank and file to Bath to train the supplementaries. Both new regiments were embodied on 12 March 1798 and each was sent a cadre of 3 sergeants, 3 corporals and 6 'well-drilled privates' from the 1st Somersets to serve as non-commissioned officers.

On 17 March both the 1st Somerset and the 'Somerset Supplementary' regiments were ordered to complete their Grenadier and Light Companies to 100 strong, ready to be incorporated with those from other militia regiments into composite Grenadier and Light battalions. These were formed on 8 May, at Maker and Stanborough respectively, in the coast defences of South West England. After training, the rest of the Eastern Battalion under Colonel Tynte (Note: Probably Col John Johnson, formerly of the 1st Foot Guards, who had married the niece and heiress of the previous colonel and changed his name to Kemeys-Tynte.) followed them to camp at Charleston Down, arriving on 18 June.

The French Revolutionary Wars saw a new phase for the English militia: they were embodied for a whole generation, and became regiments of full-time professional soldiers (though restricted to service in the British Isles), which the regular army increasingly saw as a prime source of recruits. They served in coast defences, manning garrisons, guarding prisoners of war, and for internal security, while their traditional local defence duties were taken over by the Volunteers and mounted Yeomanry.

Hostilities ended with the Treaty of Amiens on 27 March 1802, and the militia were disembodied.

== Napoleonic Wars ==
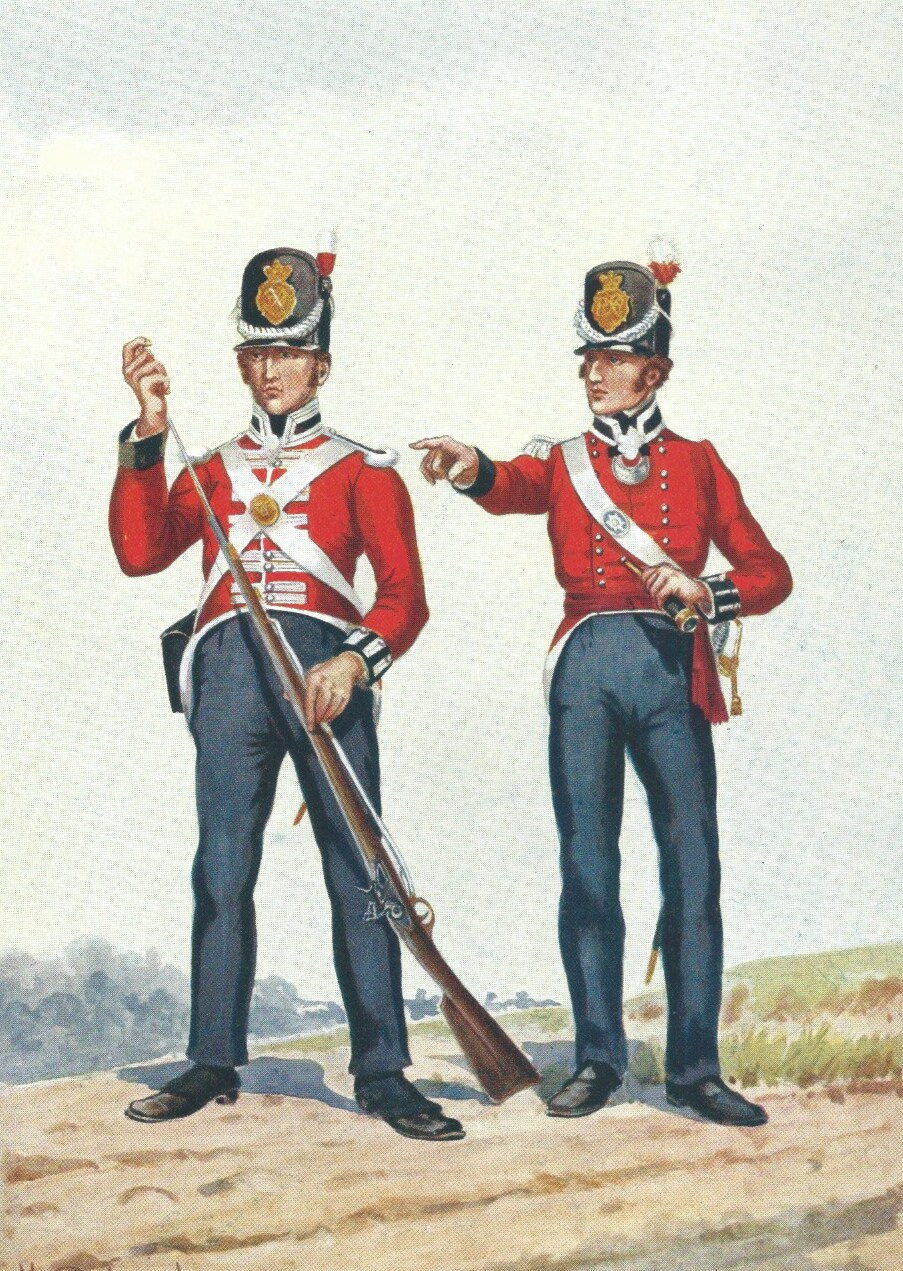
A Somerset Militia private and lieutenant between 1812 and 1816

However, the Peace of Amiens was short-lived and Britain declared war on France once more in May 1803. The 1st and 2nd Somerset Militia had already been embodied in March and were brought up to a higher establishment by supplementaries in June. Both regiments did duty in South West England. Both had detachments of selected Sharpshooters, and early in November the district commander, Maj-Gen Thomas Grosvenor, held a competition between them, the best marksmen to be awarded a red feather in their cap. (Note: The shooting competition was held at ranges of 200 and 300 yards, suggesting that Baker rifles were in use rather than the standard infantry Brown Bess smoothbore musket.)

From August to October 1804 the 1st and 2nd Somerset Militia were both stationed at Weymouth, Dorset, in a brigade commanded by Maj-Gen Lord Charles FitzRoy, while King George III was in residence at Gloucester Lodge. Viscount Hinton, son of the 4th Earl Poulett, who had been a captain in his father's 1st Somerset Militia, was appointed colonel of the 2nd Somerset on 20 September 1804. In August and September 1805, while Napoleon assembled an invasion force across the English Channel at Boulogne, the 1st and 2nd Somersets were again camped at Weymouth, brigaded with the 1st Royal Lancashire and the North Yorkshire Militia. On 1 September the 2nd Somersets consisted of 843 men in 10 companies under the command of Lt-Col Edward Andrews. In the autumn of 1805 the 2nd Somerset was again brigaded with the 1st Somerset, this time at Silverhill, East Sussex.

=== Ireland ===
An Act of Parliament in 1811 permitted militia regiments to volunteer for periods of two years' service in Ireland. The 2nd Somerset volunteered, and on 28 June 1813 the regiment embarked at Bristol bound for Dublin. Napoleon abdicated in April 1814 and it appeared that the wars were over. In September the English militia regiments in Ireland were ordered back to their home counties to be disembodied. On its return in 1814 the 2nd Somerset re-established its HQ at Bath. Early in 1815 Napoleon returned from Elba, sparking off the short Waterloo campaign, but it appears that the 2nd Somerset was not embodied during this crisis.

== Long peace ==
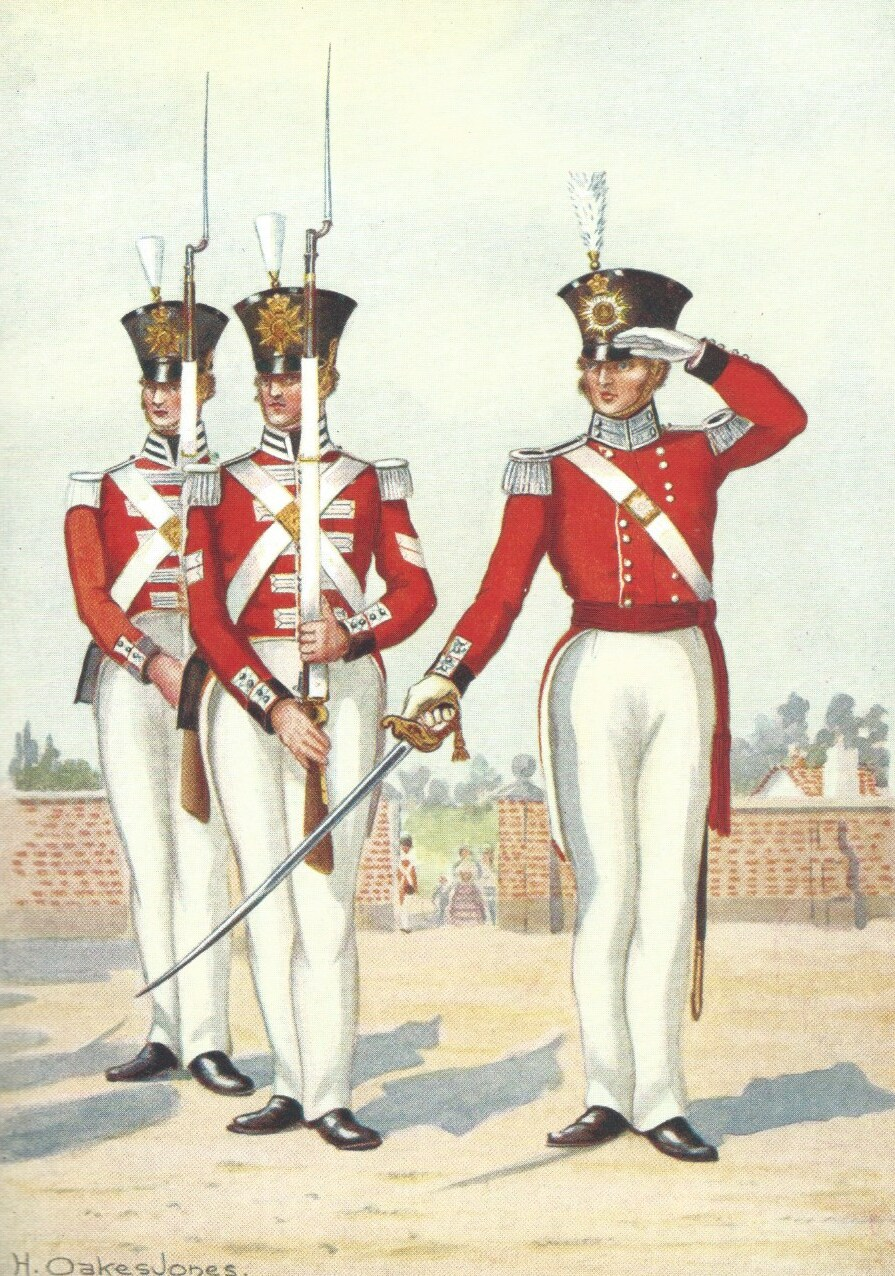
A private, corporal and captain of the Somerset Militia in 1831

After Waterloo there was another long peace. Although officers continued to be commissioned into the militia and ballots were still held until 1831, the regiments were rarely assembled for training and the permanent staffs of sergeants and drummers were progressively reduced.

On the death of the 4th Earl Poulett in 1819, Viscount Hinton succeeded to the earldom and also to the colonelcy of the 1st Somerset Militia; Sir Thomas Lethbridge, 2nd Baronet, became colonel of the 2nd Somerset. After the death of Sir Thomas Lethbridge, William Pinney, MP for East Somerset, was appointed colonel on 18 January 1850. His lieutenant-colonel was Francis Fownes Luttrell, who had been wounded at Waterloo while serving as an officer in the Grenadier Guards.

== 1852 Reforms ==
The Militia of the United Kingdom was revived by the Militia Act 1852, enacted during a renewed period of international tension. As before, units were raised and administered on a county basis, and filled by voluntary enlistment (although conscription by means of the Militia Ballot might be used if the counties failed to meet their quotas). Training was for 56 days on enlistment, then for 21–28 days per year, during which the men received full army pay. Under the Act, militia units could be embodied by royal proclamation for full-time home defence service in three circumstances:

1. 'Whenever a state of war exists between Her Majesty and any foreign power'.
2. 'In all cases of invasion or upon imminent danger thereof'.
3. 'In all cases of rebellion or insurrection'.

The 2nd Somerset Militia was revived, with Col Pinney and Lt-Col Luttrell still the senior officers, joined by the Earl of Cavan, formerly of the 7th Dragoon Guards, appointed Major on 25 August 1852.

=== Crimean War and after ===
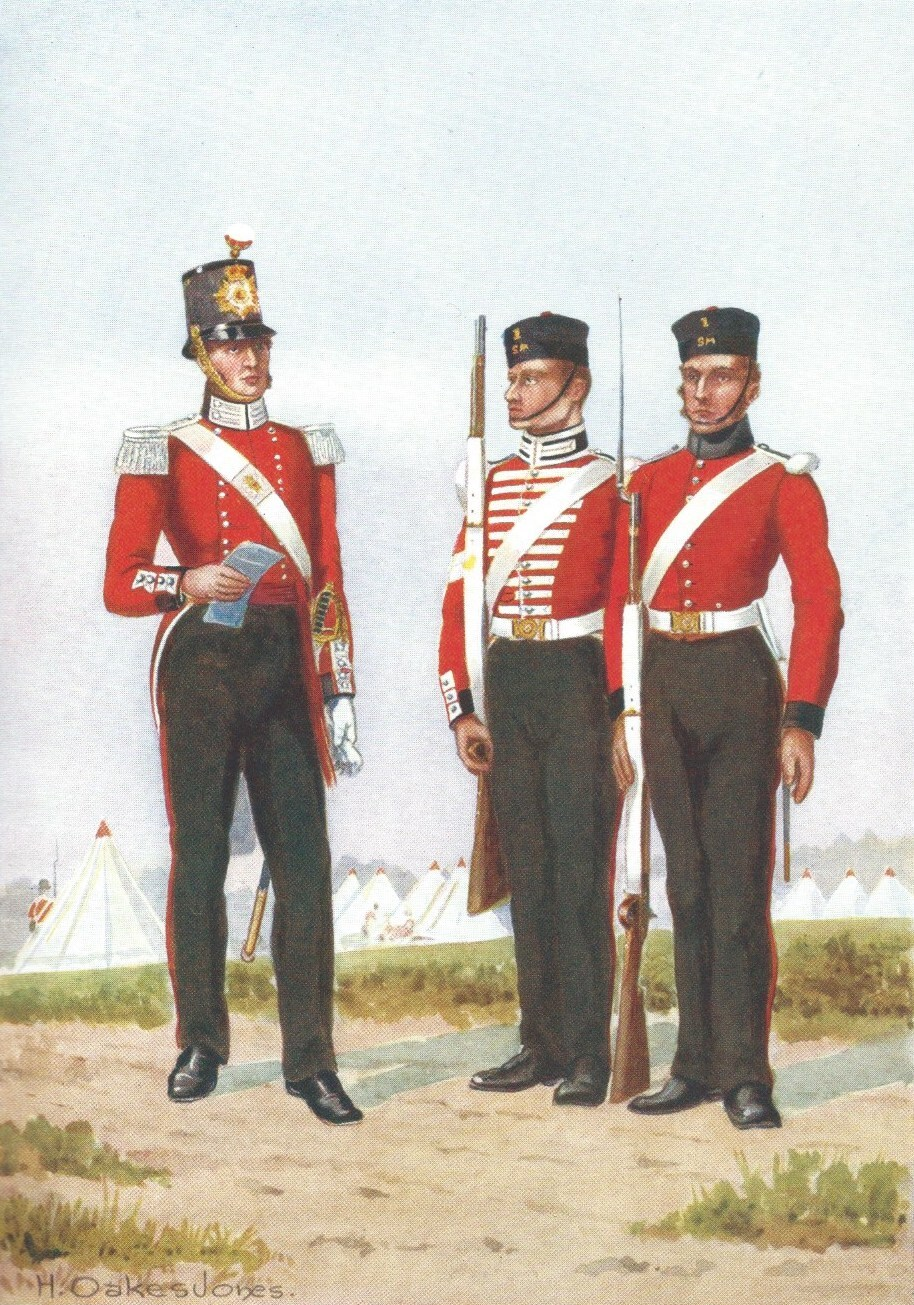
A captain, corporal and private of the Somerset Militia in 1854

War having broken out with Russia in 1854 and an expeditionary force sent to the Crimea, the militia began to be called out for home defence. The 2nd Somersets were embodied on 25 September 1854 and sent to Ireland, serving at Cork by the beginning of December. It transferred to Dublin during November 1855, moving out of the city to The Curragh by May 1856. The war had ended in March with the Treaty of Paris, and the regiment was disembodied later that year. Unlike some other regiments it was not embodied during the Indian Mutiny

Thereafter, annual training (21 or 27 days) was carried out each year. The Militia Reserve introduced in 1867 consisted of present and former militiamen who undertook to serve overseas in case of war.

Colonel Pinney retired in 1870 after 20 years in command, being appointed the regiment's first Honorary Colonel. He was succeeded in command by Alex. W. Adair, formerly of the 52nd Foot, with the rank of Lt-Col Commandant (the appointment of regimental colonel having disappeared in the Militia after 1852).

== Cardwell Reforms ==
Under the 'Localisation of the Forces' scheme introduced by the Cardwell Reforms of 1872, militia regiments were brigaded with their local regular and Volunteer battalions. Sub-District No 36 (Somersetshire) was formed at Taunton:

- 1st & 2nd Battalions, 13th (1st Somerset) (Prince Albert's Light Infantry) Regiment of Foot
- 1st Somerset Militia
- 2nd Somerset Militia
- 1st-3rd Administrative Battalions, Somerset Rifle Volunteers

The militia now came under the War Office rather than their county lords lieutenant. Around a third of the recruits and many young officers went on to join the regular army. The sub-districts were to establish a brigade depot for their linked battalions, but it was not until 1879–81 that Jellalabad Barracks was built as the depot at Taunton. The 1st and 2nd Somerset Militia had adopted Leigh Camp near Taunton as their training ground in 1873.

Following the Cardwell Reforms a mobilisation scheme began to appear in the Army List from December 1875. This assigned Regular and Militia units to places in an order of battle of corps, divisions and brigades for the 'Active Army', even though these formations were entirely theoretical, with no staff or services assigned. The 1st and 2nd Somerset Militia were both assigned to 1st Brigade of 3rd Division, IV Corps in Ireland. On 12 February 1876 the 2nd Somerset Militia was redesignated the 2nd Somerset Light Infantry Militia.

On 3 April 1878 the Militia Reserve was called out to reinforce the Regular Army during the international crisis over the Russo-Turkish War.

== Somerset Light Infantry ==
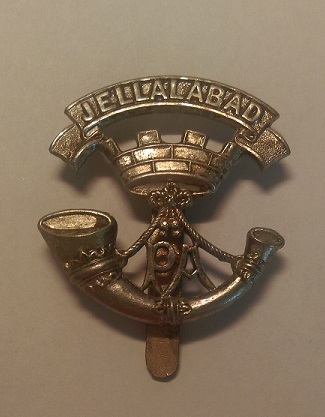
The Somerset Light Infantry's cap badge

The Childers Reforms took Cardwell's reforms further, with the linked battalions forming single regiments. From 1 July 1881 the 13th Foot became Prince Albert's (Somersetshire Light Infantry), or more familiarly the Somerset Light Infantry (SLI) with the 1st and 2nd Somerset Light Infantry Militia as its 3rd and 4th Battalions.

The militia were issued with the Martini–Henry rifle in 1882, and the Lee–Metford in 1895. The increased range and penetration of these new weapons meant that the rifle range at Leigh Camp was no longer safe. The 4th Bn moved its training ground to Bath in 1887.

=== Second Boer War ===
At the start of the Second Boer War 1899, most of the regular battalions were sent to South Africa, the Militia Reserve was mo nilised to reinforce them, and many militia units were called out to replace them for home defence. The 4th SLI were embodied on 4 December and volunteered for service in South Africa. The battalion embarked in March 1900 under the command of Col W. Long, with a strength of 27 officers and 361 other ranks (ORs). Although the 3rd Bn SLI was embodied it did not serve overseas, but two of its officers volunteered to serve with the 4th Bn.

After arriving at East London on 2 April 1900, the battalion provided guards for the Line of communications between that city and Queenstown, with the Maxim gun detachments at Burgersdorp. In December a detachment of 4 officers and 200 ORs went to join the Stormberg Garrison, while E Company went to Queenstown and Bowkers Park. In March 1901 the battalion provided the garrison for Cathcart, which was threatened by the Boers. In May, B Company went to Wonderboom and Bamboo Siding, and D Company to Bushman's Hoel. By October, J Company was employed on the Sterkstroom section of the blockhouse line and B Company at Baileytown, while a number of officers were employed on staff duties.

Peace negotiations began in April 1902 and the battalion returned to the UK, having lost one officer and 22 other ranks killed or died of disease. It was disembodied on 14 May 1902. The participants received the Queen's South Africa Medal with the 'Cape Colony' clasp, and the King's South Africa Medal with the clasps for 1901 and 1902. The battalion was awarded the Battle honour South Africa 1900–02.

== Disbandment ==
After the Boer War, there were moves to reform the Auxiliary Forces (militia, yeomanry and volunteers) to take their place in the six army corps proposed by St John Brodrick as Secretary of State for War. However, little of Brodrick's scheme was carried out. Under the sweeping Haldane Reforms of 1908, the militia was replaced by the Special Reserve, a semi-professional force similar to the previous militia reserve, whose role was to provide reinforcement drafts for regular units serving overseas in wartime. While the 3rd (1st Somerset Militia) Bn became the 3rd (Reserve) Bn, SLI, the 4th (2nd Somerset Militia) Bn was disbanded, though many members transferred to the 3rd Bn, including Maj Arthur Llewellyn, who was CO of the 3rd Bn on the outbreak of World War I. (Note: The 1st Volunteer Bn became the new 4th Bn (Territorial Force).)

== Commanders ==
The following commanded the regiment and battalion:

- Sir Charles Kemys Tynte, 5th Baronet, 3 July 1759
- Col John Kemys Tynte, formerly 1st Foot Guards, 1797
- Viscount Hinton appointed 20 September 1804, transferred to 1st Somerset Militia 23 February 1819
- Sir Thomas Lethbridge, 2nd Baronet, appointed 23 February 1819 (also colonel commandant of the West Somerset Yeomanry), died 17 October 1849
- Col William Pinney, MP, appointed 18 January 1850
- Lt-Col Alex. W. Adair, formerly 52nd Foot, appointed 12 September 1870
- Lt-Col W. Long, formerly 46th Foot, promoted 17 May 1889
- Lt-Col S.H. Woodhouse, promoted 25 June 1905

=== Honorary Colonels ===
The following officers served as Honorary Colonel:

- Col William Pinney, former CO, appointed 12 March 1870, died 30 May 1898
- Col W. Long, CMG, former CO, appointed 7 November 1903

== Heritage and ceremonial ==
=== Uniforms and insignia ===
From 1759 the Somerset Militia wore red uniforms with black facings – black being the livery colour of Earl Poulett, the Lord Lieutenant of Somerset and colonel of the 1st Somersets. The Regimental Colour would also have been black, displaying the Poulett coat of arms (when the original colours were replaced in 1762 Poulett was dissatisfied with the replacements and had new ones made at his own expense). By the time the 2nd Somerset Militia were reformed in 1798 the county militia had adopted yellow facings. By about 1811 the 1st Somersets had reverted to black facings, but the 2nd Somersets retained yellow as late as 1850. However, the reformed regiment used black velvet facings by 1855.

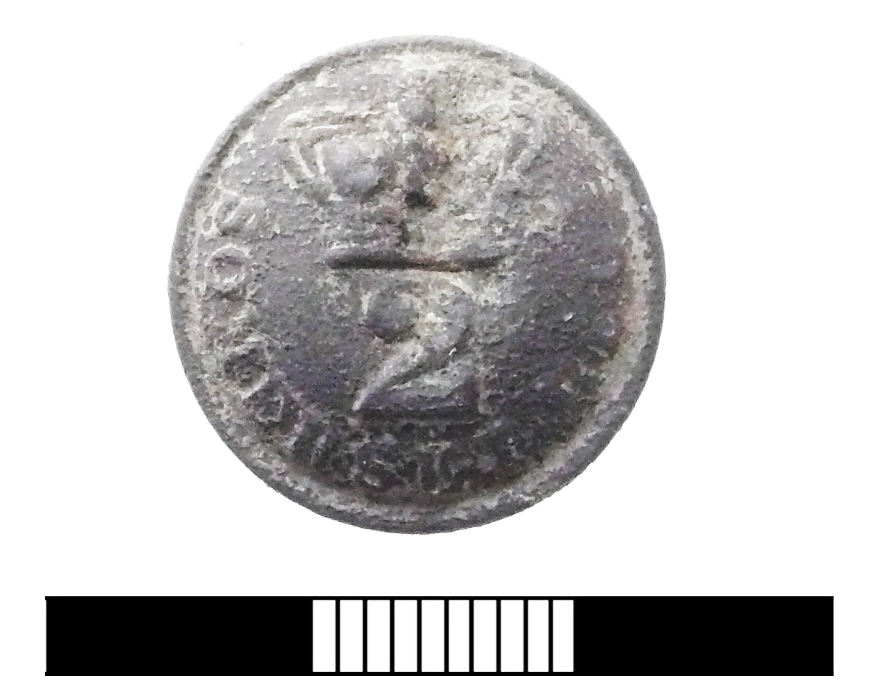
2nd Somerset Militia button found in Oxfordshire.

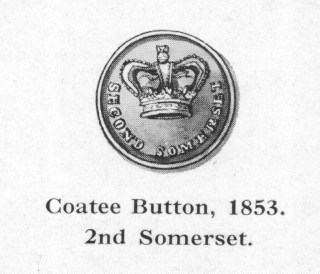

When the Somerset Militia became part of the SLI they lost their familiar black facings and adopted the blue that the SLI had been awarded when they became 'Prince Albert's' and hence a Royal regiment in 1842. The last pair of regimental colours of the 2nd Somerset Militia were given to the County Museum in 1908.

Prior to 1855 the regimental insignia had been the Royal cypher within a crowned garter inscribed Defendemus, with a spray of oak leaves on either side and a scroll beneath inscribed 'SECOND SOMERSET REGT'. The buttons had 'SOMERSET REGT.' surmounted by a crown over '2', or 'SECOND SOMERSET' surmounted by a crown. The officers' waistbelt plate of 1855–74 had the Royal cypher beneath a crown; their Shako plate of 1870 was a crowned cut star with a central design of 'VR' surrounded by a garter inscribed 'SECOND SOMERSET', within an oak wreath with a 'DEFENDEMUS' scroll beneath (see illustration). After the regiment became light infantry in 1876 the centre badge was changed to a bugle-horn. The Glengarry cap badge 1874–81 was a sword with a cross-hilt, point downwards, within a garter bearing the title, surmounted by a Saxon crown.

After it became part of the SLI in 1881, the battalion wore the insignia of that regiment, including the cap badge of a light infantry bugle-horn beneath a Mural crown surmounted by a scroll bearing the Battle honour 'JELLALABAD'.

=== Precedence ===
In 1759 it was ordered that militia regiments on service were to take precedence from the date of their arrival in camp. In 1760 this was altered to a system of drawing lots where regiments did duty together. By the time the 2nd Somerset was reformed the counties were allocated precedence by a ballot held at the outbreak of the French Revolutionary War in 1793: Somerset was 40th. Another ballot for precedence took place in 1803 at the start of the Napoleonic War and remained in force until 1833: Somerset was 9th. In 1833 the King drew the lots for individual regiments and the resulting list continued in force with minor amendments until the end of the militia. The regiments raised before the peace of 1763 took the first 47 places and the 2nd Somerset became 47th. Most regiments took little notice of the numeral.

== See also ==
- Militia (Great Britain)
- Militia (United Kingdom)
- Somerset Light Infantry
- 1st Somerset Militia
