= The Mounts =

Hamlet in Devon, England

Coordinates: 50.3279°N 3.7486°W

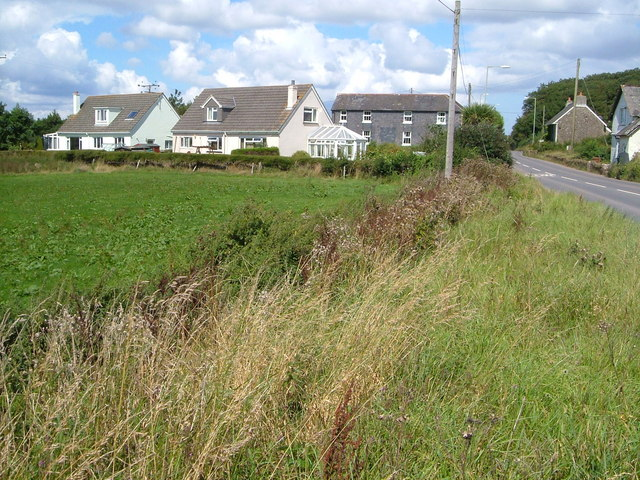
- The Mounts

- Location within Devon
- Civil parish: East Allington
- District: South Hams
- Shire county: Devon
- Region: South West
- Country: England
- Sovereign state: United Kingdom
- Post town: TOTNES
- Postcode district: TQ9 7
- Dialling code: 01548
- Police: Devon and Cornwall
- Fire: Devon and Somerset
- Ambulance: South Western
- UK Parliament: South Hams

The Mounts is a small hamlet, containing only 17 houses, situated on the A381 road between Totnes and Kingsbridge in Devon, England. It is part of the parish of East Allington, and lies about one mile away from the main village. Although The Mounts' postcode indicates it to be part of Totnes, it in fact lies much nearer to Kingsbridge.

Historically, The Mounts was on the border of the area which was evacuated during World War II so that secret rehearsals for the D-Day landings ("Exercise Tiger") could be carried out, using Slapton Sands. Properties on the east side of the A381 were evacuated, whereas properties on the west side were allowed to remain occupied. It was in St. Andrew's Church, East Allington, that the announcement of the evacuation of the area was made, on 12 November 1943.
