= Arthur Fortescue =

English cricketer and clergyman

Personal information
- Full name: Arthur Trosse Fortescue
- Born: 7 April 1848; Fallapit, Devon, England
- Died: 21 November 1899 (aged 51); Marylebone, London, England
- Batting: Right-handed
- Bowling: Unknown

Domestic team information
- Years: Team
- 1868–1871: Oxford University

Career statistics
| Competition | First-class |
|---|---|
| Matches | 19 |
| Runs scored | 480 |
| Batting average | 15.00 |
| 100s/50s | –/1 |
| Top score | 68 |
| Balls bowled | 686 |
| Wickets | 15 |
| Bowling average | 19.40 |
| 5 wickets in innings | – |
| 10 wickets in match | – |
| Best bowling | 3/28 |
| Catches/stumpings | 12/– |
- Source: Cricinfo, 14 August 2019

Arthur Trosse Fortescue (7 April 1848 – 21 November 1899) was an English first-class cricketer and clergyman.

The son of William Blundell Fortescue, he was born in April 1848 at the Fallapit Estate near East Allington, Devon. He was educated at Marlborough College, before going up to Christ Church, Oxford. While studying at Oxford, he made his debut in first-class cricket for Oxford University against the Marylebone Cricket Club at Oxford in 1868. He played first-class cricket for Oxford until 1871, making a total of sixteen appearances. He scored 420 runs in his sixteen matches, at an average of 14.48 and a high score of 68. With the ball, he took 15 wickets at a bowling average of 19.40, with best figures of 3 for 28. In 1872, he appeared once for the Gentlemen of England against Oxford University, before taking holy orders and becoming a Church of England clergyman in 1876. He held various curacies until 1883, at which point he became the vicar of Hainton with Sixhills in Lincolnshire. He later toured North America in September–October 1886 with a team formed by the Devon amateur E. J. Sanders, making two first-class appearances on the tour against Philadelphia at Germantown. Fortescue married Clara Harriet Pease in 1894, before dying at Marylebone in November 1899.
