= East Allington =

Village in Devon, England

Coordinates: 50°19′N 3°44′W

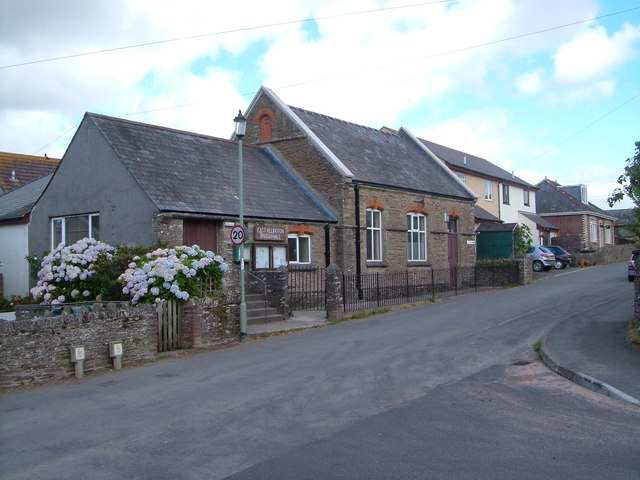
- East Allington parish hall

- Location within Devon
- Population: 596 (2001 census)
- Civil parish: East Allington
- District: South Hams
- Shire county: Devon
- Region: South West
- Country: England
- Sovereign state: United Kingdom
- Post town: TOTNES
- Postcode district: TQ9
- Dialling code: 01548

East Allington is a village and civil parish in the South Hams district of Devon, England, three miles (5 km) south of Halwell and just off the A381 road. It lies about three miles (5 km) from Kingsbridge and about ten miles (16 km) from Totnes. The coast at Slapton Sands is about five miles (8 km) to the south-east. Also in the parish is the hamlet of The Mounts, about one mile (1.6 km) away.

The parish is surrounded clockwise from the north by the parishes of Halwell, Blackawton, Slapton, Stokenham, Frogmore and Sherford, Buckland-Tout-Saints and Woodleigh. Its population at 2001 was 596, up from 396 in 1901. The village is also part of the electoral ward named Allington and Loddiswell with a population at the 2011 census of 2,265. Historically, East Allington formed part of Stanborough Hundred, and for ecclesiastical purposes, it falls within Woodleigh Deanery.

The church, dedicated to St. Andrew, overlooks the village from a hillside position. The first rector here was presented in 1268, and Bishop Grandisson dedicated the altar in 1333. The present building, however, dates from the 15th and 16th centuries.

It was in East Allington Church, on 12 November 1943, that the announcement was first made to the people of a large part of the South Hams that they were all to be evacuated from the area by 20 December 1943. Although nobody was told the reason, it was because The War Office had chosen to use Slapton Sands to rehearse the D-Day landings, as the beach at Slapton is very similar to the beach at Normandy which had been chosen for the landings. Ultimately, 749 American soldiers died at Slapton Sands in April, 1944 in a German attack during the exercises.

Today, East Allington is a thriving village, with some new housing. It has a church, primary school, village hall, public house and recreation ground. Every year the road through the village is closed for the whacky races which involve home-made soap box style go-karts racing downhill against the clock along a course lined with hay bales and crowds of people.

== Fallapit ==
Fallapit was an estate held by a junior branch of the Fortescue family which first settled in England in the 12th century in the vicinity of Modbury in Devon and was granted the estate of Wimpstone near Modbury by King John in 1208. The estate was acquired by Sir Henry Fortescue (fl. 1426), Lord Chief Justice of the Common Pleas in Ireland, by his second marriage to the daughter and heiress of Nicholas de Fallopit. The Fallopit branch soon ended in an heiress, Elizabeth Fortescue, great-granddaughter of Sir Henry, who took the manor by marriage to her cousin Lewis Fortescue (d.1545), a younger son of the Fortescues of Spridleston, in Brixton, Devon, who was a Baron of the Exchequer under King Henry VIII. One of the lords of the manor was Sir Edmund Fortescue (1610–1647), a royalist commander during the Civil War. He defended Salcombe Castle for the king and on its fall in 1646 was allowed by the parliamentarians to march out honourably with the armed garrison which he took to Fallapit. He was allowed to keep the key to the castle, which remained at Fallapit until its sale by the family when the key was sold by the auctioneer for half a crown.

The last in the male line of the Fallapit Fortescues was Edmund Fortescue (1660–1734), on whose death the estate descended via his eldest daughter Mary Fortescue (1690–1710) to the family of her husband and cousin Sir William Fortescue (1687–1749) of Buckland Filleigh, Devon, KC, PC (son) a British judge and Master of the Rolls 1741–49. Mary died an early death on 1 August 1710; a monument exists to her in St Andrew's Church, East Allington. They had a daughter who was their sole heiress: Mary Fortescue (1710–1752), who inherited the Fortescue estate of Fallapit from her mother. Her monument survives in St Mary's Church, Buckland Filleigh, consisting of a tablet of white and veined buff marble. She married John Spooner and produced an only daughter Mary Spooner (d.1747) who died an infant. The next heir was Mary's aunt Elizabeth Fortescue (1695–1768), the 2nd daughter of Edmund Fortescue (1660–1734) of Fallapit. Elizabeth's heir was her great-nephew Edmund Wells (1752–1779), who by royal licence assumed the name and arms of Fortescue. He was the eldest son of Rev. Nathaniel Wells (d.1762), Rector of East Allington, by his wife Catherine Bury, the daughter of Sir Thomas Bury of Exeter by his wife Dorothy Fortescue (1699–1733), the 3rd daughter of Edmund Fortescue (1660–1734) of Fallapit. The son and heir of Edmund (Wells) Fortescue was Edmond Nathaniel William Fortescue (born 1777), a major in the South Devon Militia, who was the proprietor of Fallapit in 1810.

The house was rebuilt circa 1810–15 in a pseudo-Elizabethan style near the site of the ancient mansion, and was "enlarged and beautified" in 1849. Before 1870 the Fortescues sold the estate to William Cubitt (1834–1891), the sixth son of Thomas Cubitt (1788–1855), co-founder of the famous London building firm. He was a younger brother of George Cubitt, 1st Baron Ashcombe (1828–1917). William was a JP for Devon and a lieutenant in the Coldstream Guards. He kept a pack of foxhounds at Fallapit and in 1875 financed the parish church of St Andrew to the sum of £2,500. An inscribed brass plate in his memory exists in the church.

William Blundell Fortescue (died 1903 at Octon, Torquay) was the last Fortescue (originally Wells) to reside at Fallapit House. He sold the house and grounds and various other properties in East Allington parish, in 1868 to William Cubitt. William Cubitt spent money on repairing Fallapit House, East Allington church, and replacing many of the cob and thatched dwellings, in East Allington village, into stone and slate dwellings. He also rebuilt many of the farm houses. At his death his widow moved to Kingsbridge, and the house was used by his brother George Cubitt. On the death of George Cubitt (1st Baron Ashcombe) in 1917, his son Henry Cubitt (2nd Baron Ashcombe)acquired Fallapit and a large portion of East Allington parish. In 1924, Lord Ashcombe sold the whole estate to Thomas Place, of North Allerton, who kept it whole and sold the estate in March 1925. Fallapit House and some adjoining fields were bought by Mr Howard, of Yelverton, who sold the house and estate to Gordon Hope Robinson in 1926. Mr G. H. Robinson sold the house in 1948 to Mr Shelley, who held it to May 1950 when he sold the house and grounds to Miss Marva Claire Temple (died 1976), who ran her co-educational boarding school, St Thomas More's School, there from May 1950 to 1958, when she retired. Miss Muriel Mary O'Brien (died 08.05.2000) carried on the school, though for boys only. On 17 December 1997, the school closed, and in 1999, the house and estate were sold to CSMA (Civil Service Motoring Association). In January 2001, Fallapit House was guttered and various buildings demolished. The house remained a guttered ruin for a number of years. In 2016, the house was acquired etc. and converted into flats and new premises were built. As of 2024, it is a private estate.

In 2008 the house was split into 8 apartments and retains only 20 acres (8 ha) of the former large estate.

== Notable people ==
- Arthur Fortescue (1848–1899), cricketer
- Rik Mayall (1958–2014), comedian and actor
