= A381 road =

Road in Devon, England

A381

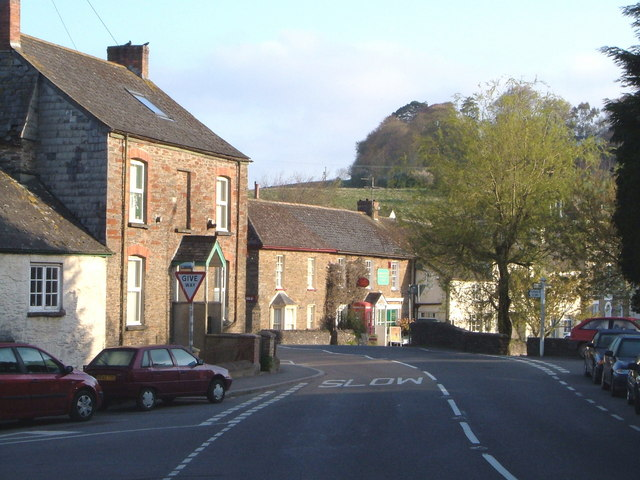
- A381 at Harbertonford

Route information
- Length: 34 mi (55 km)

Major junctions
- Northeast end: Teignmouth; 50.5472°N 3.5097°W
- A379 A383 A380 A382 A385 A3122 A379
- Southwest end: Salcombe; 50.2322°N 3.7778°W

Location
- Country: United Kingdom
- Constituent country: England
- Primary destinations: Teignmouth; Newton Abbot; Totnes

Road network
- Roads in the United Kingdom; Motorways; A and B road zones

The A381 road is a non-trunk 'A'-class road in Devon, England which serves as an important link between the towns of Teignmouth, Kingsteignton, Newton Abbot, Totnes and Salcombe and many villages in between, with the busiest section (in Newton Abbot) having 6 lanes and carrying an average of over 40,000 vehicles per day. The route overlaps with other A-roads for several sections of its length. It is a faster route from Teignmouth to Salcombe than the A379 which meets it at both ends. It is under the control of Devon County Council as highway authority.

== Route ==
The A381 starts in Teignmouth from a junction with the A379 at Shaldon Bridge, following the Teign Estuary to Kingsteignton, where it overlaps the A380 to cross the River Teign. At the Penn Inn Roundabout it then continues west on a short dual carriageway into central Newton Abbot and southwest to Totnes. Here it overlaps the A385 to cross the River Dart and the main London-Penzance railway line.

From a junction on the west of Totnes it rises southwards into the South Hams. This section of the road is an important link to the national road network for the town of Dartmouth (served by the A3122) as the alternative A379 via Torbay is reliant upon the Dartmouth Higher Ferry with its associated fares and peak-time queues. As the road approaches Kingsbridge it enters the South Devon Area of Outstanding Natural Beauty and skirts around the edge of the town, overlapping for a short distance with the A379 road before finally turning south to Salcombe. An identically-numbered spur from this road turns back eastward to Kingsbridge.

== History ==
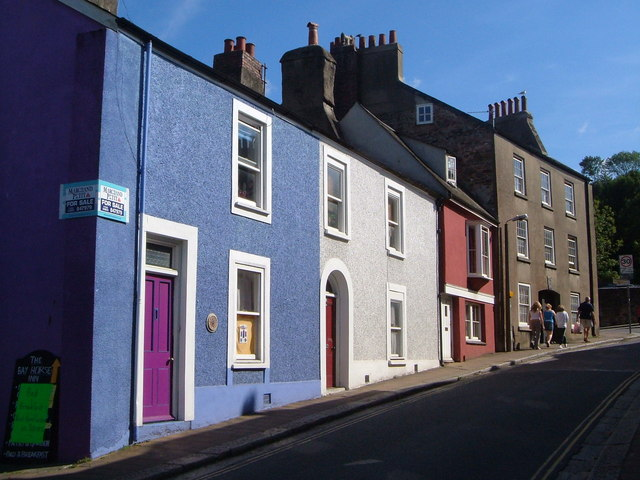
Former alignment of A381 in Totnes before bypass

The constant pressure of traffic through the narrow streets of Totnes town centre prompted the construction of the Western Bypass around the edge of the town, together with a second crossing of the River Dart at Brutus Bridge in 1982. The tight-knit nature of the town centre's development, quickly thinning to countryside, meant that relatively few buildings needed demolition to facilitate construction of the new road.

In 1991 and 2006 the route through and around Kingsbridge was redrawn twice, when the section northwest of Kingsbridge was downgraded to B-road status leaving a gap in the route, and subsequently diverted to the former route of the B3197 around the west side of the town leaving the original section through West Alvington as a spur of the new road.

As a rural main road, the A381 has been the scene of multiple accidents. During 2008-2010 there were three fatal accidents on the section from Totnes to Halwell, prompting Devon County Council to implement a Casualty Severity Reduction Scheme, improving road markings and signage.

On Sunday 20 May 2012 a 0.7-mile (1.1 km) section of the road through Totnes was part of the Olympic Torch procession for the London 2012 Olympics.

== List of settlements ==
These towns and villages are either on or immediately adjacent to the road, in the order they appear travelling northeast to southwest. There are other settlements but only those with their own Wikipedia article are included here.

- Teignmouth
- Bishopsteignton
- Kingsteignton
- Newton Abbot
- Abbotskerswell
- Ipplepen
- Totnes
- Harbertonford
- Halwell
- The Mounts
- West Alvington
- Kingsbridge
- Malborough
- Salcombe

== See also ==
- A roads in Zone 3 of the Great Britain numbering scheme
