= Stanborough =

Iron Age hill fort in Devon, England

Coordinates: 50.3521°N 3.7266°W

Stanborough is the site of an Iron Age hill fort near the village of Halwell, south of Totnes, Devon, England. The fort is situated on a promontory on the western edge of a hill at about 200 metres (660 ft) above sea level. The site was first listed as a historical heritage in 1923.
