= Halwell =

Village in Devon, England

Coordinates: 50.366°N 3.721°W

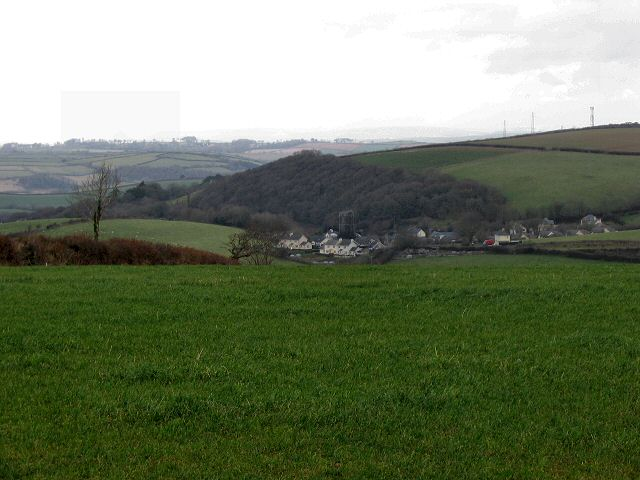
- The village of Halwell as seen from nearby Moreleigh

- Location within Devon
- OS grid reference: SX776531
- Civil parish: Halwell and Moreleigh
- District: South Hams
- Shire county: Devon
- Region: South West
- Country: England
- Sovereign state: United Kingdom
- Post town: TOTNES
- Postcode district: TQ9 7
- Dialling code: 01548
- Police: Devon and Cornwall
- Fire: Devon and Somerset
- Ambulance: South Western
- UK Parliament: South Hams

Halwell is a village, former parish and former manor, now in the parish of Halwell and Moreleigh, in the South Hams district, in the county of Devon, England.

== Geography ==
It is located 5 miles (8.0 km) south of Totnes, 6 miles (9.7 km) north of Kingsbridge and 8 miles (13 km) west of Dartmouth, on the junction of the A381 and A3122 roads serving the three towns.

== Civil parish ==
On 1 April 1986 the parish of Moreleigh was merged with Halwell. On 12 July 1990, the new parish was renamed to "Halwell & Moreleigh". In 1961 the civil parish of Halwell (prior to the merge) had a population of 219.

== Toponymy ==
The name means "The holy well" and it derives from Old English halig: "holy" plus wylle: "well". It is first attested as halganþille in a 16th-century copy of an early 10th-century document. Other early forms include Halgewill(e) and Halgh(e)wille (14th century or earlier), Hallewell (c. 1400), and Holwell (1675).

== History ==
During the Saxon era Halwell was one of the four burhs, or fortified settlements, established in Devon by King Alfred the Great (d.899), King of Wessex from 871 to 899, to defend against invasion by Vikings. At that time the other three were Exeter, Pilton (near Barnstaple) and Lydford. According to the Burghal Hidage (an early 10th Century document describing all burhs then functioning), Halwell's town wall was 1,237 feet long and the garrison consisted of 300 men who could be drawn from the surrounding district in the event of an invasion. However, by the close of the 11th century its status as a burh had been transferred to Totnes, 5 miles to the north and situated on the River Dart, probably because it was better placed for trade at a time when the Viking threat had diminished, after which the significance of Halwell greatly decreased.

=== Descent of the manor ===
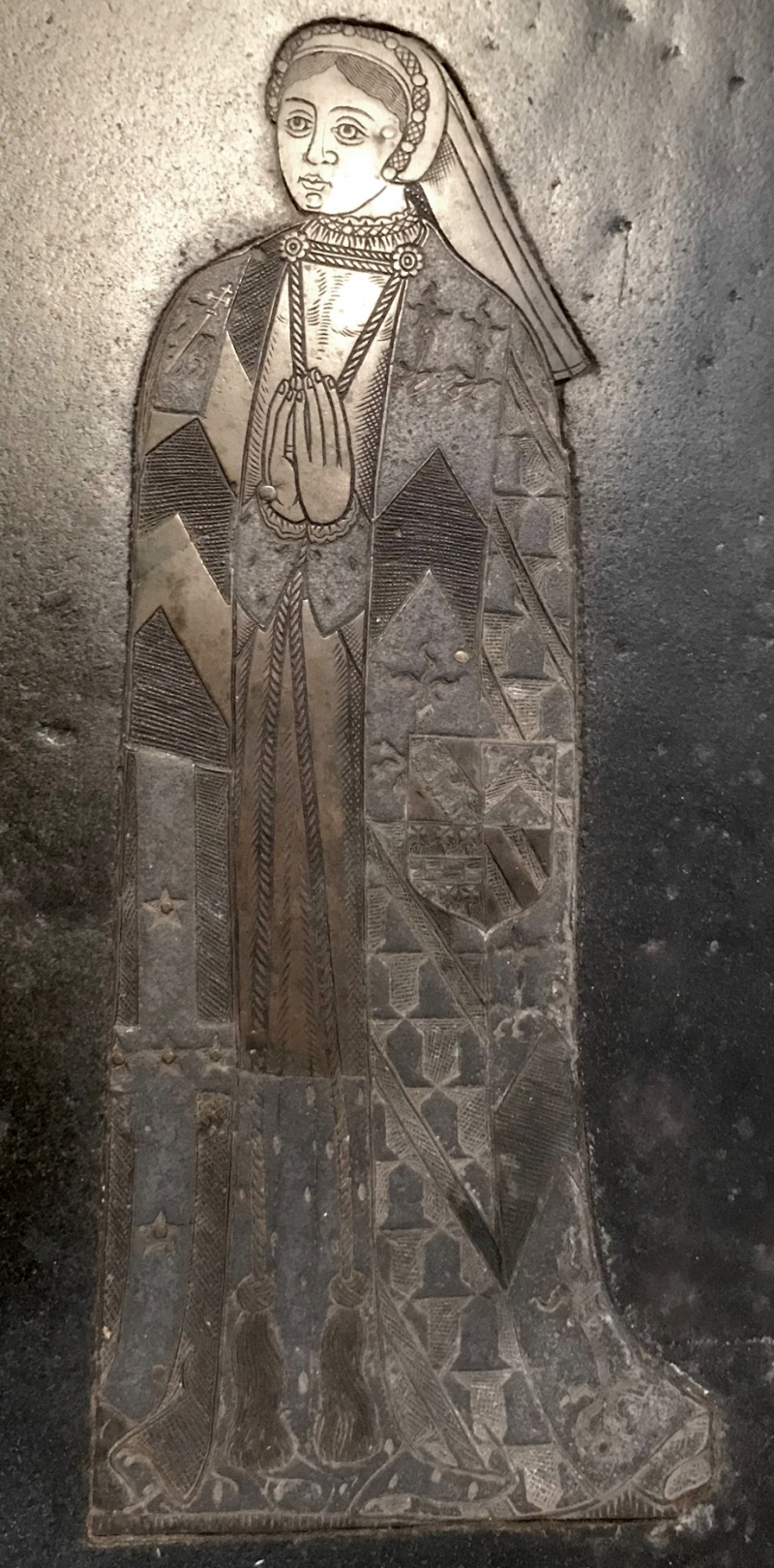
left: Arms of Halwell of Halwell: Or, on a bend gules three goats passant argent; right: monumental brass in Aldbury Church, Hertfordshire, of Lord Braye's daughter, Elizabeth Bray (d.1573), wife of Sir Ralph Verney. The inescutcheon of pretence of four quarters displays the arms of her heiress mother, Halwell, quartering Norbury, Boteler and Sudeley

According to William Pole (died 1635), from the reign of King Edward I the manor was the seat of the de Halgawell family, which resided there for several generations. Sir John Halgawell (or Halliwell) was Steward of the Duchy of Cornwall under King Henry VII (1485-1509), and Admiral of the Fleet and a Knight of the Body. His son was Richard Halgawell, the last in the male line, who married Joan Norbury, daughter and heiress of John Norbury of Stoke in Surrey. His daughter and heiress was Joan Halgawell, who married Edmund Braye, 1st Baron Braye (c.1484-1539) of Eaton Bray in Bedfordshire. Her eventual heiress and inheritor of the manor of Halwell was her second of six daughters, namely Elizabeth Bray (d.1573), who married Sir Ralph Verney (1509-1546), of Pendley in Tring, Hertfordshire, and of Middle Claydon, Buckinghamshire, whose monumental brasses with heraldic shields survive in the Church of St. John the Baptist, Aldbury, Hertfordshire. On Elizabeth Bray's robe are engraved the arms of Verney (quarterly of four) impaling Bray (quarterly of four: 1&4: Bray modern; 2&3: Bray ancient, all charged with an inescutcheon of pretence of four quarters: 1: Or, on a bend gules three goats argent (Hallighwell); 2: Sable, a chevron between three bull's heads cabossed argent (Norbury); 3: Gules, a fess chequy argent and sable between six crosslets formée fitchée argent (Boteler); 4: Or, two bends gules (Sudeley).
