= South Dartmoor =

Protected area in Devon, England

Coordinates: 50.482304°N 3.9295538°W

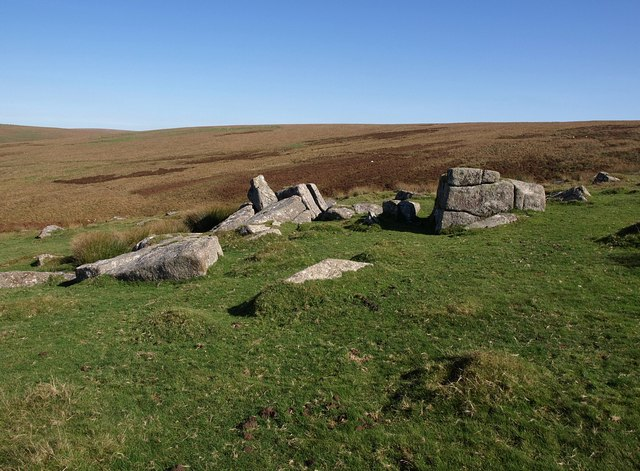
Shavercombe Tor, within South Dartmoor SSSI

South Dartmoor is a Site of Special Scientific Interest (SSSI) within Dartmoor National Park in Devon, England. It is located north of the village of Cornwood. This protected area extends from Rock Tor in the south to Fox Tor in the north. Other peaks within this protected area include Calveslake Tor, Shavercombe Tor and Great Trowlesworthy Tor. Areas of peatland within South Dartmoor SSSI include Foxtor Mires, Aune Head Mires, Fishlake Mire and Red Lake Mire. Rivers arising in this protected area include the River Erme, the River Avon and River Swincombe. Streams around Shavercombe Tor flow into the River Plym and so this area is called the Upper Plym Valley. Much of the land in the Upper Plym Valley are common land.

South Dartmoor SSSI is adjacent to three other protected areas: Dendles Wood SSSI, Piles Copse SSSI and Holne Woodlands SSSI and so is part of a broader area of nature protection.

== Biology ==
The upland areas in this protected area contains some of the most extensive areas of blanket bog and mosaics of acid grassland and heathland in southern Britain. Moss species in the blanket bog on high ground include Sphagnum papillosum, Sphagnum auriculatum, Sphagnum capillifolium, Sphagnum magellanicum and Sphagnum imbricatum.

In the acidic grassland found on hill slopes, the dominant shrub is bilberry. Moss species in this habitat include Pleurozium schreberi, Rhytidiadelphus loreus, Racomitrium lanuginosum, Hylocomium splendens, Thuidium tamariscinum and Hypnum jutlandicum. The lichen species Umbilicaria pustulata has been recorded growing on granite boulders here.

Moss species in valley bottom mires include Sphagnum palustre, Sphagnum pulchrum, Sphagnum recurvum and Polytrichum commune. Marsh clubmoss has also been recorded in valley bottom mires.

Bird species recorded in South Dartmoor SSSI include red grouse, dunlin, snipe, whinchat and wheatear.

Preserved pollen within peat taken from this protected area (near Blacklane Brook) have provided a palynological record of vegetation 5000 BC to 2000 BC.

== Archaeology ==
To the west of Great Trowlesworthy Tor, there are remains of Bronze Age settlements.

== Land ownership and management ==
Two major landowners that own land within South Dartmoor SSSI are the Duchy of Cornwall and the National Trust (the Duchy of Cornwall owns the section north of Green Hill; the National Trust own the area between Great Trowlesworthy Tor and Calveslake Tor). The National Trust are the lead partner for a project for peatland carbon conservation in Dartmoor and the Upper Plym Valley. A review of habitat condition of the National Trust's Upper Plym Estate was published by Natural England in 2023. This review found that the four habitat types surveyed in the Upper Plym Valley (blanket bog, wet heath, dry heath and acid grassland) are all in unfavourable condition and recommended, in addition to national action, sustainable land management interventions supported through agri-environment agreements.

Two further estates that own land within South Dartmoor SSSI are the Blachford Estate and the Delamore Estate.
