= Fardel Manor =

Historic manor in Devon, England

Coordinates: 50.4003°N 3.9543°W

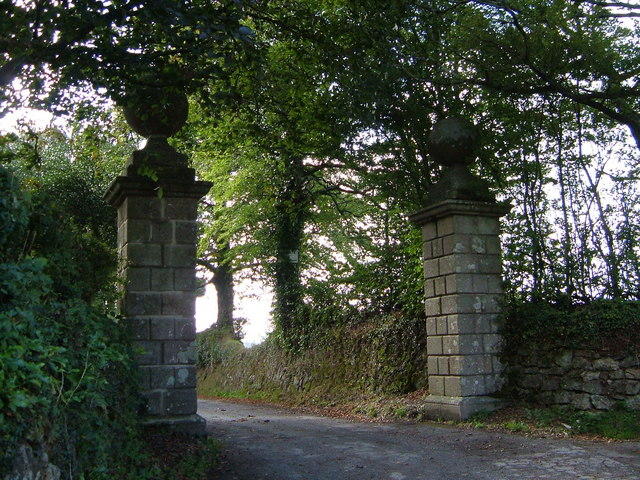
Entrance gates to Fardel manor house

Arms of Newton of Fardel: Argent, on a bend cotised azure three garbs or

Arms of Raleigh of Fardel: Gules, five fusils conjoined in bend argent

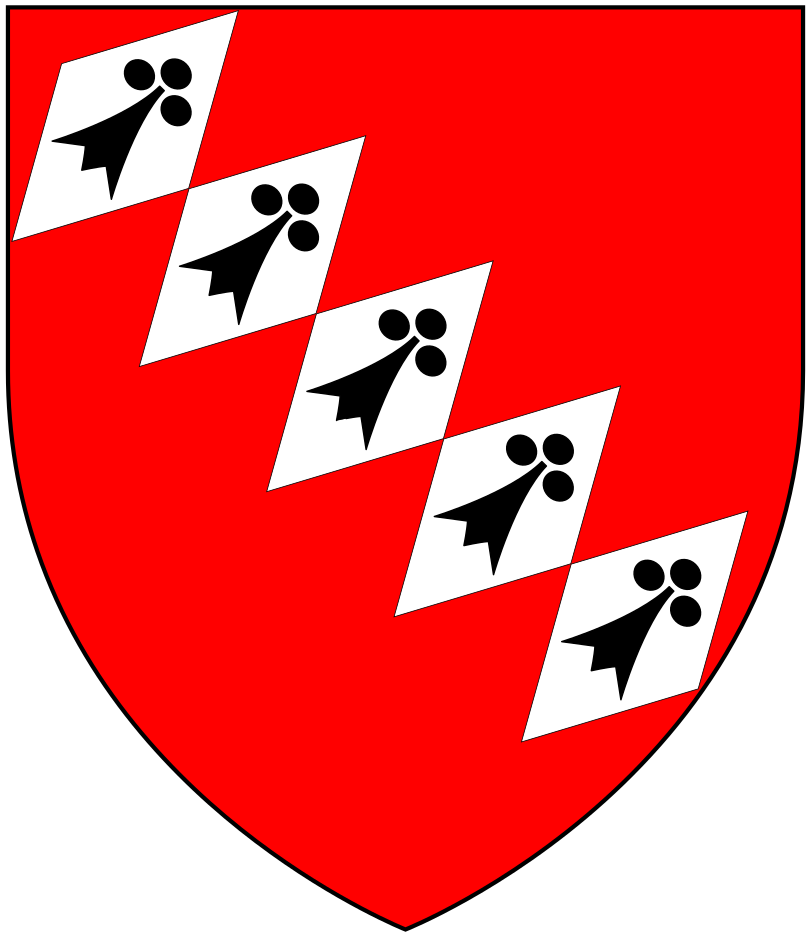
Arms of Hele of Fardel: Gules, five fusils in bend argent on each an ermine spot

Fardel is a historic manor in the parish of Cornwood, in the South Hams district of Devon. It was successively the seat of the Raleigh and Hele families. The surviving Grade I listed medieval manor house is situated about half-way between Cornwood and Ivybridge, just outside the Dartmoor National Park on its south-western border.

== Manor house ==
The manor house comprises a complex group of buildings of widely varying dates consisting of a double-courtyard mansion with a third courtyard of farm buildings to the west. There is a separate Grade II* listed chapel known to have been licensed by the Bishop of Exeter in 1422 or 1432. There is a walled garden with a fish pond.

== Descent ==
It is listed in the Domesday Book of 1086 as Ferdendelle, the 67th of the 79 Devonshire holdings of Robert, Count of Mortain, half-brother of King William the Conqueror and one of that king's Devon Domesday Book tenants-in-chief. Ferdendelle possibly signifies "fourth part", that is a quarter of some larger estate. The Count's tenant was Reginald I de Vautort (died about 1123), of Trematon Castle in Cornwall, the first feudal baron of Trematon, who held 57 manors from the Count. The Anglo-Saxon tenant before the Norman Conquest of 1066 was a certain Dunn, as recorded in the Domesday Book. Ferthedel is the form in which it is later listed in the Book of Fees (c.1302), held from the feudal barony of Trematon.

=== FitzJoell ===
It subsequently descended to the FitzJoell family. In 1242 it was the dwelling of Waren FitzJoell, the last in the male line, who left a daughter and heiress Ellen FitzJoell, who married William Newton, to whose descendants the manor passed.

=== Newton ===
William Newton, having inherited Fardel on his marriage to the heiress Ellen FitzJoell, lived at Fardel during the reign of King Edward I (1272-1307), but died without male issue, leaving a daughter and sole heiress Jone Newton, who in 1303 married Sir John Raleigh of Smalerigge in the parish of Axminster, Devon, whose descendants made Fardel their seat.

=== Raleigh ===
Sir John Raleigh, who married the heiress Jone Newton, was the son and heir of Sir Hugh Raleigh of Smalerigge. This branch of the Raleigh family was more anciently seated at Nettlecombe Raleigh in Somerset, but was probably originally a junior branch of the de Raleigh family, lords of the manor of Raleigh in the parish of Pilton in North Devon.

Later members of the family resident there included Members of Parliament Adam Ralegh (c.1480–1545 or later) and Carew Raleigh (ca. 1550 – ca. 1625).

=== Hele ===
Carew Raleigh (c.1550-c.1625) sold the manor of Fardel to Walter Hele, father of Elize Hele (1560–1635) of Parke in the parish of Bovey Tracey, Devon, a lawyer and philanthropist (whose monument with recumbent effigy survives in Bovey Tracey Church), in whose family it remained until 1740.

=== Later owners ===
After 1740 there were several owners, one of whom was Sir Robert Palk (1717–1798) of Haldon House in the parish of Kenn, in Devon. In 1850 it was in use as a farmhouse, occupied by Arthur Trowbridge Horton.

== Fardel Stone ==
In the mid-nineteenth century a large stone, which had been used as part of a footbridge over a stream at Fardel, was recognised as bearing an Ogham inscription. The inscription, in Goidelic (Primitive Irish), reads "SVAQQUCI MAQI QICI", meaning "[The stone] of Safaqqucus, son of Qicus". In 1861 the stone was presented to the British Museum, where it remains. In Latin it reads "FANNONI MAQUT RINI". "Fannon son of Utrin" - the letter count is the same suggesting that they could be equivalent.
