= Parke, Bovey Tracey =

Historic estate in Devon, England

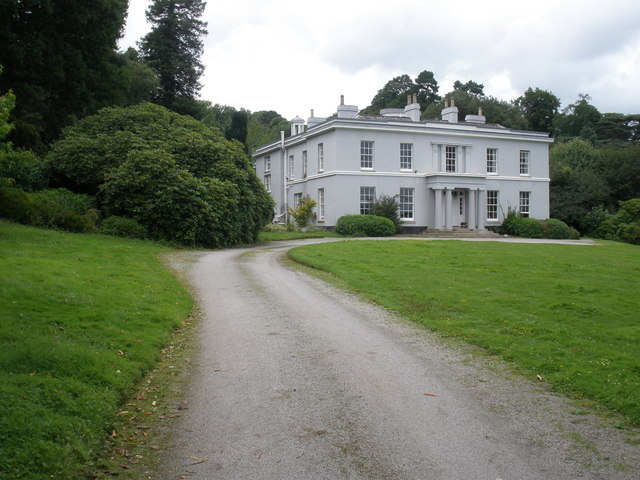
Parke House in 2009, as rebuilt in 1826/8 by William Hole (1799-1859)

Parke is an historic estate in the parish of Bovey Tracey in Devon, England. The present mansion house known as Parke House, a grade II listed building situated 1/2 mile west of the centre of the town of Bovey Tracey and on the opposite side of the River Bovey, was rebuilt in 1826/8 by William Hole (1799-1859) and is today the headquarters of the Dartmoor National Park Authority.

== Descent ==
=== Eveleigh ===
Parke was the seat of Nicholas Eveleigh (died 1618), a junior barrister, who served as Steward of the Stannary Court of Ashburton, Devon. He died aged 56 when the roof of Chagford Stannary Courthouse collapsed, killing him and nine others. His "sumptuous" monument with an effigy survives in Bovey Tracey Church.

=== Hele ===
Eveleigh's widow married the lawyer Elize Hele (1560–1635) (also seated at Fardel in the parish of Cornwood, Devon), who founded Plympton Grammar School (alias Hele's School). An elaborate monument with an effigy to Elize Hele survives in Bovey Tracey Church, facing that of Eveleigh.

=== Stawell ===
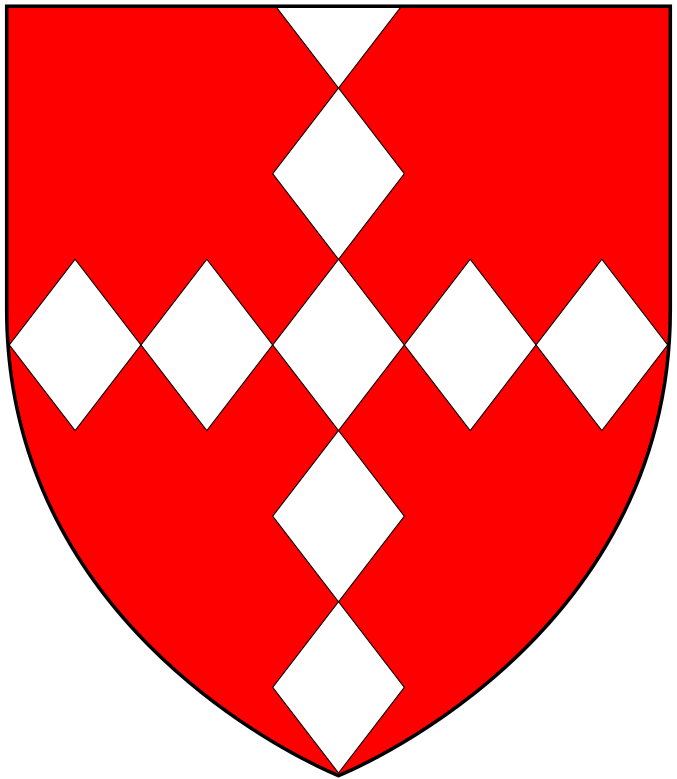
Arms of Stawell

Sir John Stawell (1625-1669) of Parke, a counsellor-at-law. In 1653 he purchased Torre Abbey, Torquay. He married Sarah Stephens, a daughter of Nathaniel Stephens (1589–1660), of Eastington in Gloucestershire, twice a Member of Parliament for Gloucestershire. He had at least three sons, the eldest of whom, William Stawell (c.1651-1702), MP, erected a mural monument to his father and younger brother in Bovey Tracey Church.

William Stawell (c. 1651 – 1702), son and heir, of Parke, was elected nine-times a Member of Parliament for Ashburton in Devon, due to his patronage derived from his ownership of a moiety of the manor and borough of Ashburton. He died unmarried.

=== (Dunning) ===
Pevsner suggests that Parke, Bovey Tracey, was a seat of the prominent lawyer and politician John Dunning, 1st Baron Ashburton (1731–1783), but he appears to have confused it with a farmhouse called "Park" (7 miles south-west of Parke, Bovey Tracey) within his manor of Widecombe-in-the-Moor on Dartmoor, to which shortly after his acquisition of that manor he had "added a room or two". This farmhouse he enlarged and transformed into a house called Spitchwick Park (to be distinguished also from Stickwick near Hennock, 2 miles north-east of Bovey Tracy, a seat of the Hole family).

=== Clapp ===
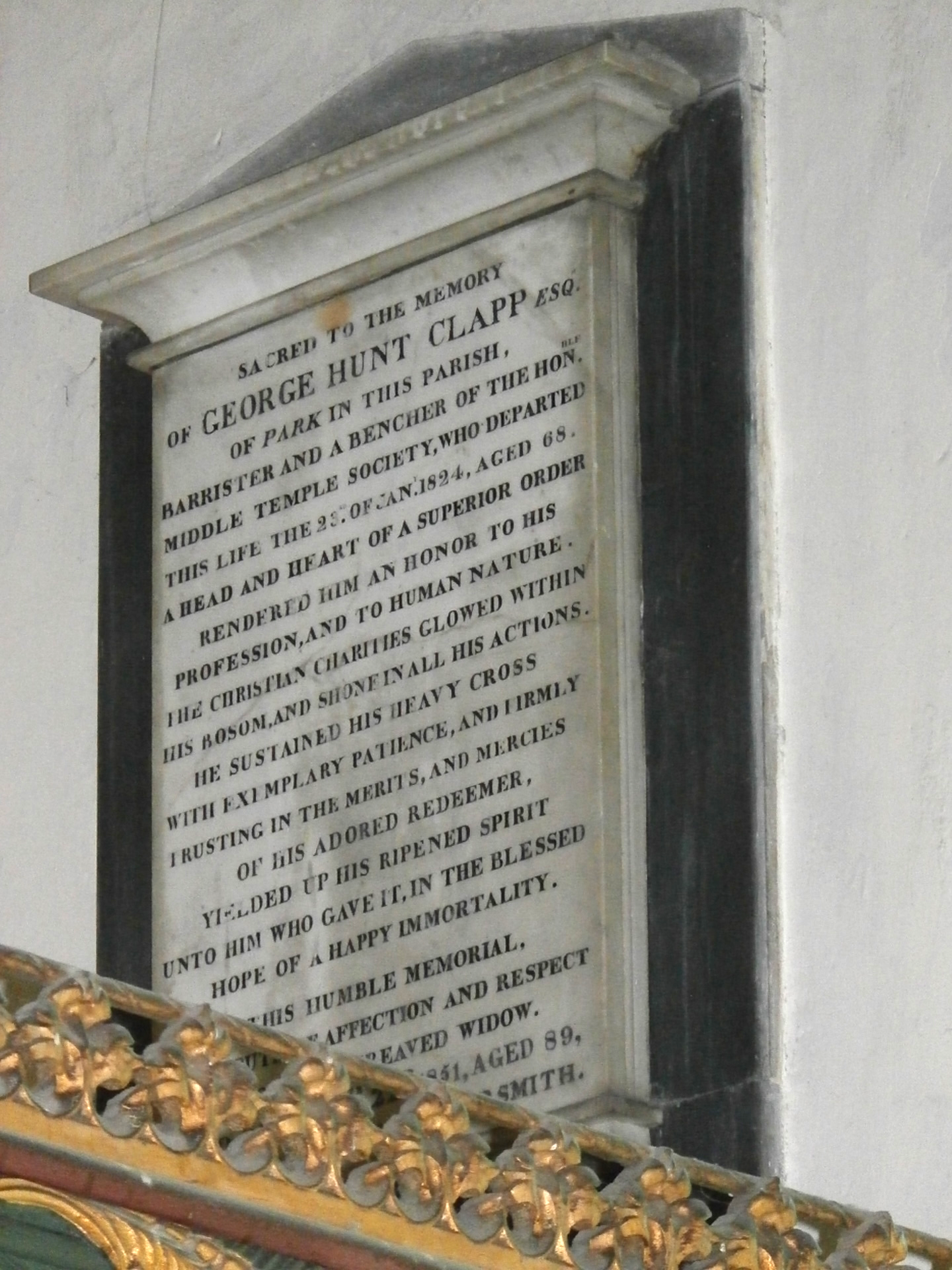
Mural monument to George Hunt Clapp (1756-1824), Bovey Tracey Church

It was the seat of George Hunt Clapp (1756-1824), a barrister and a bencher of the Middle Temple, and in 1798 a governor for life of the Magdalen Hospital in London. His inscribed mural monument survives in Bovey Tracey Church. His origins are revealed by the will of his grandfather George Hunt (d.1768) of Northwick, signed 31 October 1766. He leaves all his freehold lands and tenements in the parishes of North Bovey and Throwleigh, immediately upon his own decease, to "my grandson George Luxton, son of Thomas Luxton and Elizabeth his wife, my daughter, of Winkleigh, Esq.," with remainders to " my granddaughter Elizabeth Luxton, sister of the said G. L.," and "my granddaughter Mary Luxton, younger sister of the said G. L." He leaves Tarr Mill in S. T., immediately after his decease, to "my grandson George Hunt Clapp, son of Robert Clapp and Mary his wife, my youngest daughter, of Ottery St. Mary, gent.," with remainders to " my grandson Francis Hunt Clapp," and others.

=== Hole ===
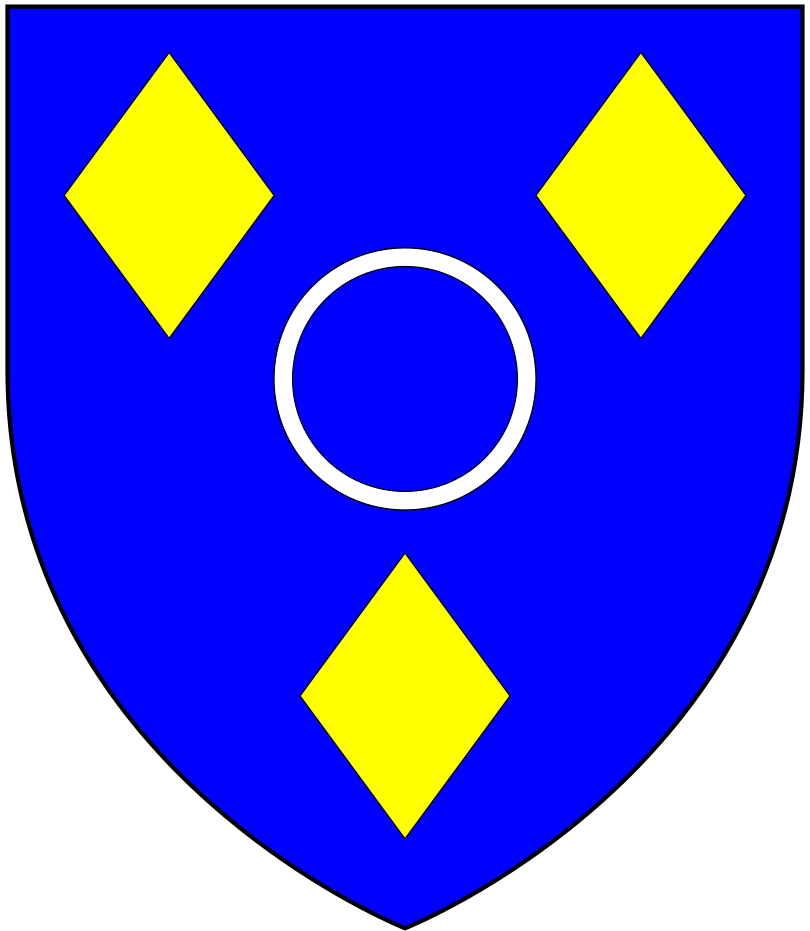
Arms of Hole: Azure, an annulet argent between three lozenges or

==== William Hole (1799-1859) ====
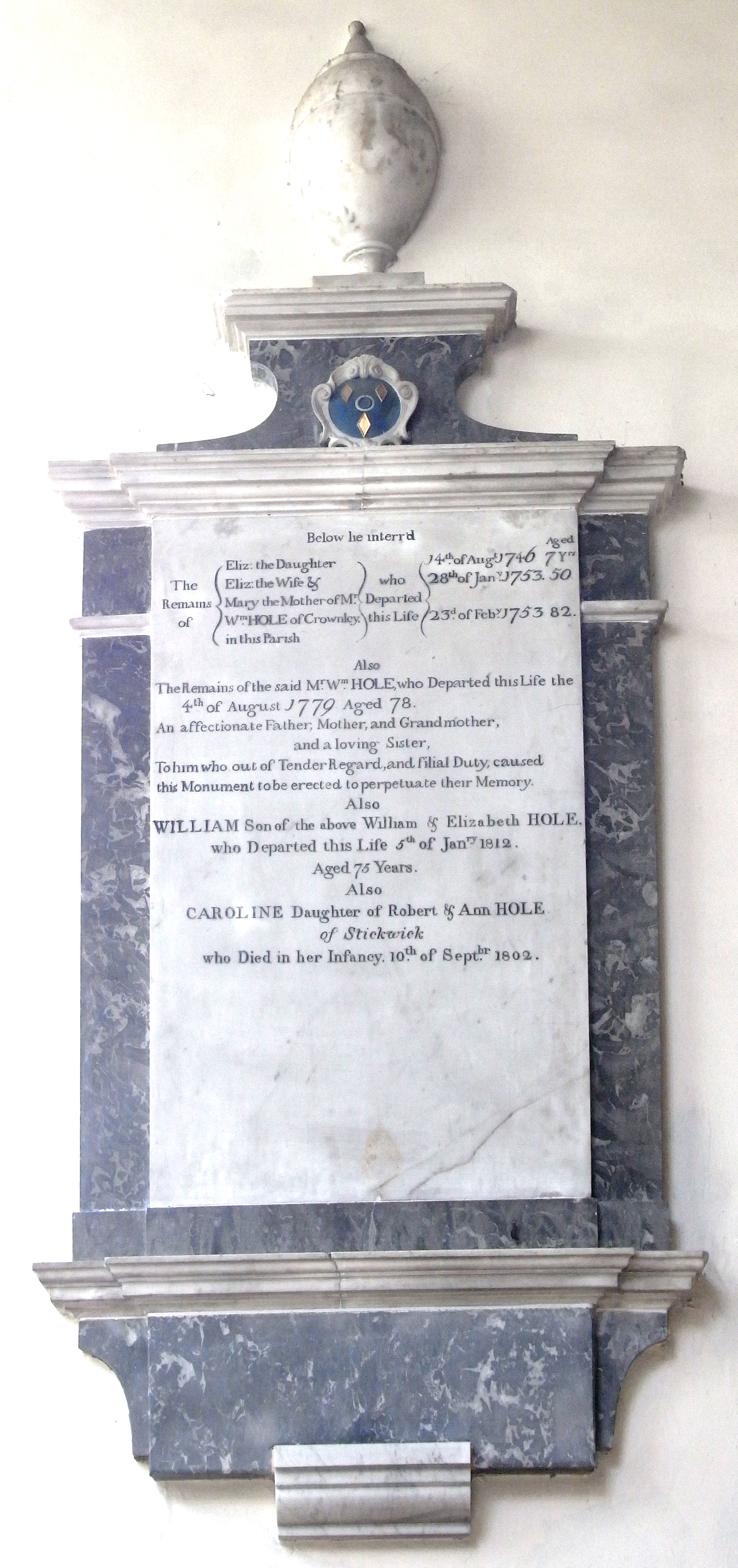
Monument in Bovey Tracey Church to William Hole (1701-1779) of Crownley, Bovey Tracey, grandfather of the rebuilder of Parke House

William Hole (1799-1859) of Stickwick (in the parish of Bovey Tracey, 2 miles north-east of that town), purchased the nearby estate of Parke in 1825. He was the only son and heir of Robert Hole (1742-1822) who built Stickwick in 1780-2, (son of William Hole (1701-1779) of Crownley, in the parish of Bovey Tracey, by his wife Anne Blatchford, daughter of Theophilus Blatchford) by his wife Anne Pitts (d.1809), a daughter of Joseph Pitts of Kiln in the parish of Drewsteignton, Devon. He was educated at Harrow and in 1822 married Susan Kitson (d.1895), eldest daughter of Rev. William Kitson, of Shiphay, Devon. In 1826/28 he demolished the ancient house at Parke and rebuilt it as the present surviving house.

==== William Robert Hole (1831-1903) ====
William Robert Hole (1831-1903), Justice of the Peace, Deputy Lieutenant, only son, a Chartered Accountant, whose portrait is in the collection of the National Trust. He was educated at Winchester and Eton. In 1875 he married Laetitia Parlby, a daughter of Rev. John Hall Parlby, JP, of Manadon, near Plymouth. He died in a horse-riding accident on 7 February 1903. In 1905 his widow presented a stained glass window to Bovey Tracey Church in his memory, depicting the Resurrection, forming the east window of the Lady Chapel.

==== William Gerald Hole (1881-1974) ====
Major William Gerald Hole (1881-1974), son, who was educated at Winchester and Merton College, Oxford. He served in the Devon Imperial Yeomanry (Royal 1st Devon Yeomanry) at Gallipoli and in Palestine during World War I. In 1905 he married Mildred Bingley, daughter of Rev. John Bingley of Woodford, Torquay, by whom he had an only daughter and sole heiress (Mildred) Geraldine Hole (1908-2008), who in 1939 married Fleetwood Hugo Pellew (1910-2008) of Coppelia House, Moreton Hampstead, Devon (2nd cousin of Pownoll Irving Edward Pellew, 9th Viscount Exmouth (1908–1970)), and left one daughter. William Gerald Hole presented a stained glass window to Bovey Tracey Church depicting the Road to Emmaus, forming the south window of the Lady Chapel.

He bequeathed the Parke estate, comprising the house and 239 acres, to the National Trust.

Several inscribed mural monuments to the Hole family of Parke, Stickwick and Crownley, survive in Bovey Tracey Church, also the east and south windows of the Lady Chapel, donated by the family.

=== Dartmoor National Park Authority ===
The mansion house of Parke is today leased to the Dartmoor National Park Authority, and is used as the operational Headquarters.
