= Plympton Grammar School Old Boys =

P.G.S.O.B
- Full name: Plympton Grammar School Old Boys
- League: Premier 3
- Founded: 1926
- Home ground: The Long Room

Personnel
- Captain: Gareth Roberts

Plympton Grammar School Old Boys is an English field hockey team in Plymouth, Devon. PGSOB as they are commonly known are notable for being one of Plymouth's oldest men's hockey clubs, having been formed in 1926.

== History ==
PGSOB was formed in 1926 and has direct links to Hele's School, formerly Plympton Grammar School.

As of 2009, the 2009/10 season finished with the 1st team remaining in South West Premier 3 finishing in 3rd place. PGSOB's 1st XI progressed to their third successive Devon Men's Cup Final, losing to ISCA 4–1.

PGSOB have successfully completed their England Hockey Clubs First accreditation and have adopted a new development strategy which covers the next four years (2010–2014). The club are attempting to work at minimum operating standards to provide a safe, effective and child friendly hockey environment. This in turn will look to provide the club with a nationally recognised ‘Clubmark’ status and has already enabled PGSOB to gain accreditation to the Plymouth City Council Sports Development Unit.

== Club colours and teams ==
The club's colours include a black and old gold tiled shirt with black shorts. PGSOB currently fields four men's league teams. These teams range from a first team XI in Premier 3 to a 4th team XI in South West District 1 League. They also have Veterans, U21, U18, Indoor, touring teams and many players involved in the Plymouth Mixed Summer League Hockey League.

== Home ground ==
PGSOB play all their home games at The Long Room AstroTurf all-weather pitch. The pitch is part of the internal training infrastructure of 3 Commando Brigade Royal Marines base located in Stonehouse, Plymouth. PGSOB'S home games are normally played on a Saturday at varied times.

== Notable players ==
One of the most talented to come through the ranks of the club's youth system is Nicholas Hunwicks (Formally of Nottingham Trent University Hockey Club) who has gone on to play for The HTUHC First team. Hunwicks has played in the highest University League with Trent in the Northern Premier. He is also tour boy.

Whilst the club's youth system produced some great players over the years, the club also gained some top class talent from other clubs. Arguably the most talented of these players was former Milton Keynes Hockey Club goalkeeper, Tristan Andrews. He joined the club having represented Buckinghamshire County through juniors to senior level where he saved a drag flick from Michael Jackson. This among many other of his hockey exploits can be heard frequently recalled at club functions.

Goalkeeper Ben Blundy, who started playing for the club at 14 after being spotted by his French Teacher, later represented England at Over-35s level.

== Team captains (2009) ==
PGSOB's current first team captain is currently Gareth Roberts, The B team (2) is captained by Andy Latchford, The C team (3) is captained by Simon West and the D team (4) is captained by Nick Davidson
