= Nicholas Eveleigh (died 1618) =

Steward of the Stannary Court of Ashburton, Devon

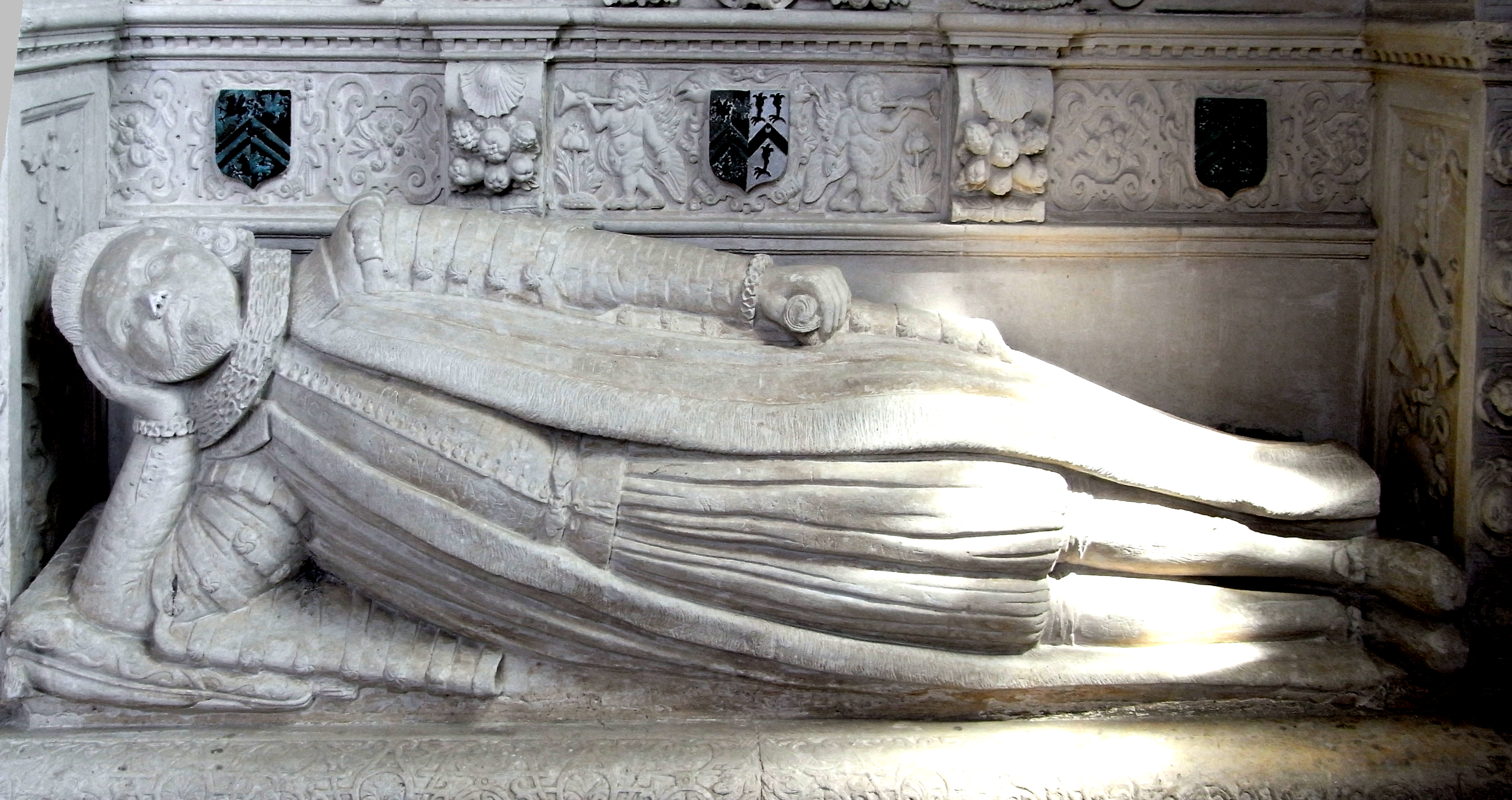
Effigy of Nicholas Eveleigh, Bovey Tracey Church. Above are the arms of Eveleigh and Eveleigh impaling Bray (Argent, a chevron between three eagle's legs erased sable)

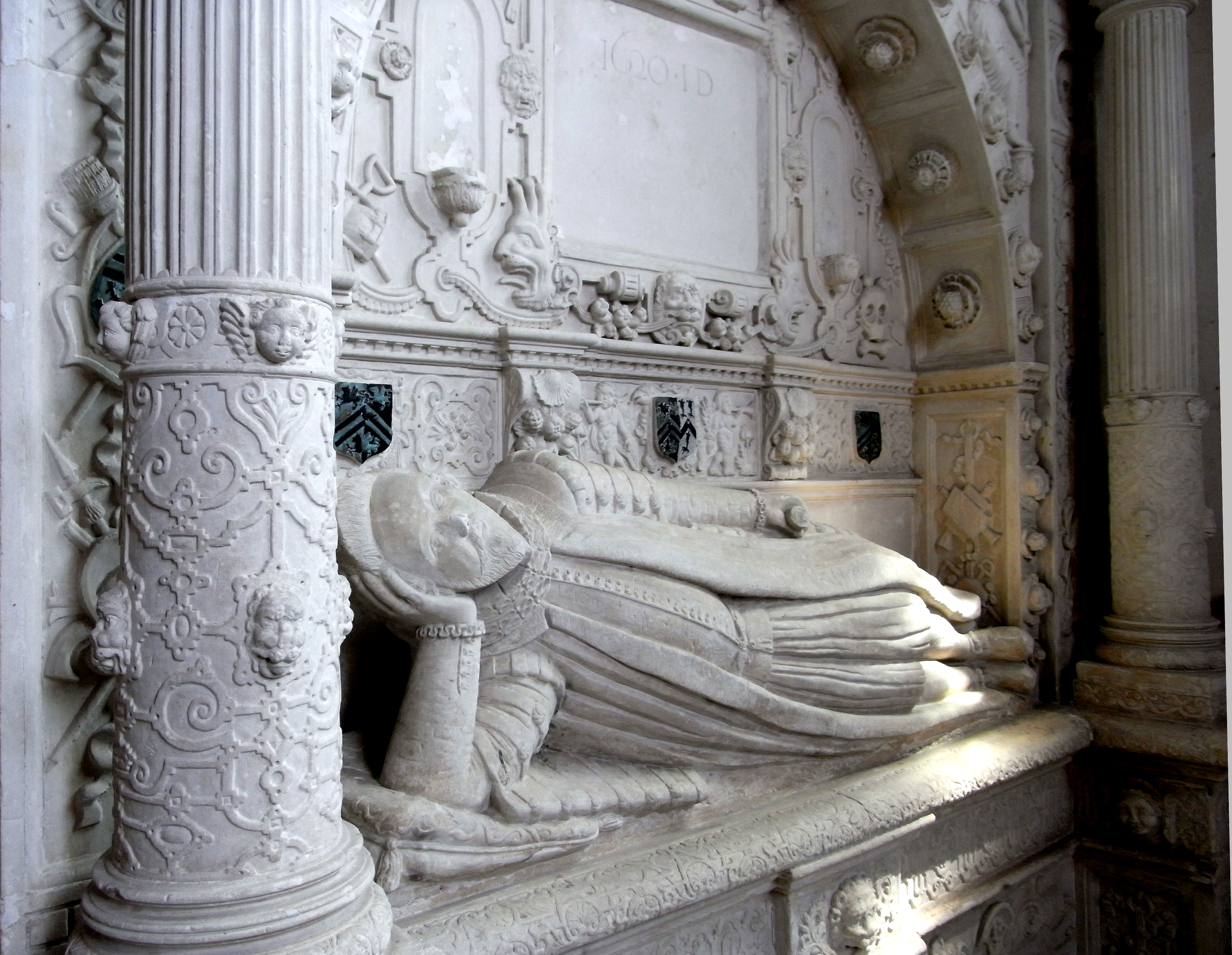
Detail of effusive strapwork decoration on monument to Nicholas Eveleigh, Bovey Tracey Church, with inexplicable inscription above "1620 ID"

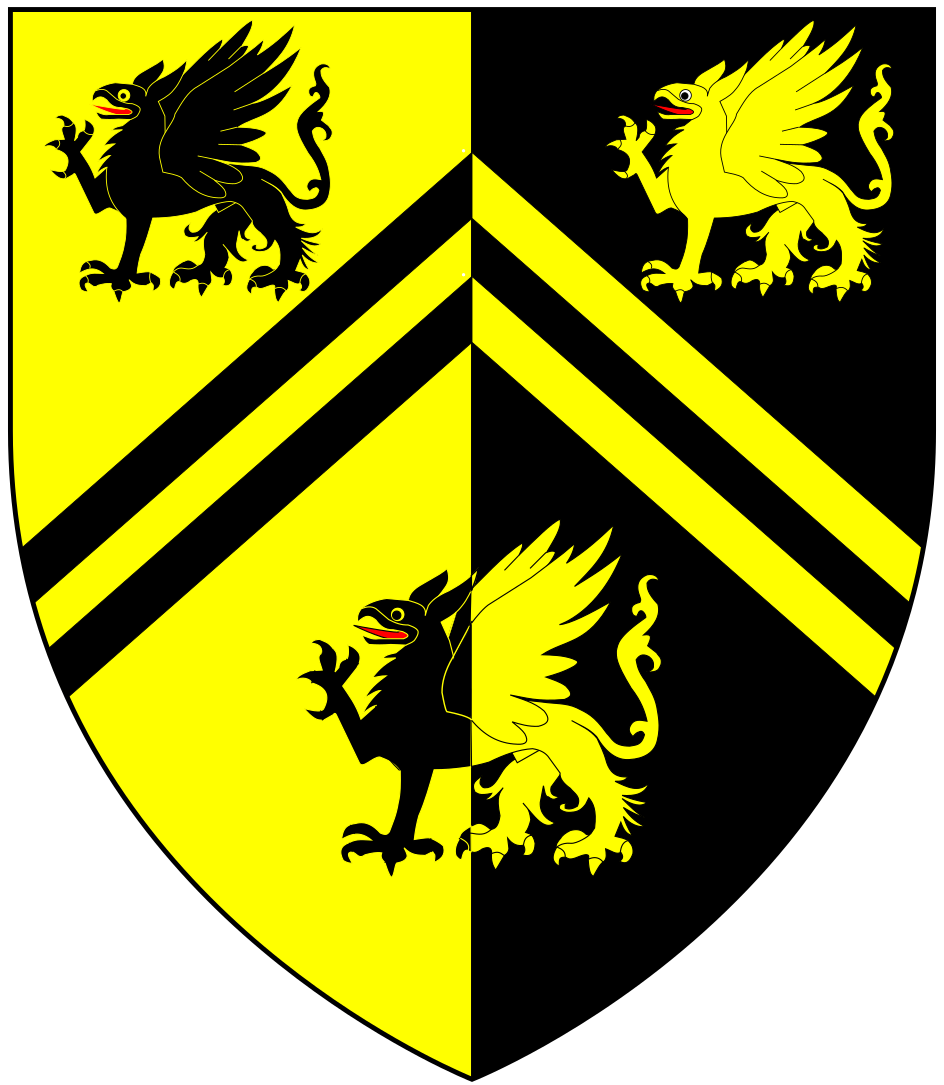
Arms of Eveleigh: Per pale or and sable, two chevronels between three griffins passant counterchanged

Nicholas Eveleigh (1562–1618) of Parke in the parish of Bovey Tracey in Devon, was an utter barrister, and served as Steward of the Stannary Court of Ashburton, Devon. He died aged 56 when the roof of Chagford Stannary Courthouse collapsed, killing him and nine others. His "sumptuous" monument survives in Bovey Tracey Church.

== Origins ==
=== Father ===
He was the 5th son of John Eveleigh of Holcombe in the parish of Ottery St Mary, a Justice of the Peace for Devon from 1564, and a feodary (an officer of the Court of Wards) for Devon, in which capacity he served on several commissions and patents regarding wardships and inquisitions post mortem, on many of which he was joined by William Peryam. According to Pole, John Eveleigh acquired the manor of Holcombe having foreclosed on a loan by mortgage made by him to the previous owner, a member of the Moore family, which became forfeited to him. He made Holcombe his seat, and was succeeded there by his eldest son and heir George Eveleigh. According to Zmarzly (2007) "(John) Eveleigh is an example of a man who, once he was named a JP, became part of the landed gentry and thereby a man of quality".

=== Mother ===
Nicholas's mother, his father's second wife, was Joane Southcott, a daughter of John Southcott (died 1556) of Indio in the parish of Bovey Tracey, Devon, a Clerk of the Peace for Devon, who rebuilt the house at Indio - in the words of the Devon historian Pole (died 1635): "Bwilded a fayre howse & dwelled theire". Southcott was steward of Thomas Cromwell by which relationship he obtained several monastic holdings in Devonshire on favourable terms.

=== Brother ===
Nicholas's eldest brother George Eveleigh of Holcombe was a Roman Catholic, as is witnessed by a warrant issued at the Quarter Sessions of Easter 1605, to search the houses of "George Eveleigh and Thomas Babington, of Ottery St. Mary, upon credible information of great resort made to them in the night season and other unlawful times of Recusants, Papists, and other persons ill-affected to his Majesty". These persons "that repaired thither were suspected of being Semynaries, Jesuites, or massing Priests, and to bringe with them Popishe bookes, vestments, and other unlawful reliques".

=== Brother-in-law ===
Nicholas was the brother-in-law of Edwin Sandys (died 1629), of Northbourne, Kent, married firstly to his sister Margaret Eveleigh (he married secondly Anne Southcote, a daughter of Thomas Southcote of Bovey Tracey). Sandys was many times a Member of Parliament for various constituencies including Plympton Erle and was the second son of Edwin Sandys, Archbishop of York and at the University of Oxford Sandys' tutor was Richard Hooker, author of the Ecclesiastical Polity, whose lifelong friend and executor Sandys became. Sandys attended the Middle Temple at the same time as Nicholas Eveleigh. Sandys was admitted to new chambers on 26 November 1591 and on 1 December 1595 relinquished his place in the latter on 18 May 1596 to Nicholas Eveleigh, who had been admitted to the Temple on 11 November 1590; The following record survives:

"Mr. Nicolas Eveleigh to the chamber of Messrs. Benn and Edwin Sandis, jun., in place of the latter; fine, 20s."

=== Early origins ===
The Eveleigh family originated at the manor of Eveleigh (alias "West Eveleigh") in the east part of the parish of Broadclyst, Devon, as Pole wrote concerning the manor of Evelegh: "The name of Evelegh have had, of good antiquity, land in this place" A prominent later member of the family was John Eveleigh (1748–1814), Provost of Oriel College, Oxford.

== Career ==
He was a pupil of Richard Hooker. He was admitted to the Middle Temple on 11 November 1590, of which Inn of Court was Edwin Sandys, Hooker's former pupil and junior colleague at Oxford. He became Master of the Temple. He purchased the estate of Parke in the parish of Bovey Tracey. In 1608 Eveleigh was Steward of the Stannary Court of Ashburton, when Sir William Courteney of Powderham was Vice-Warden of the Stannary.

== Marriage and children ==
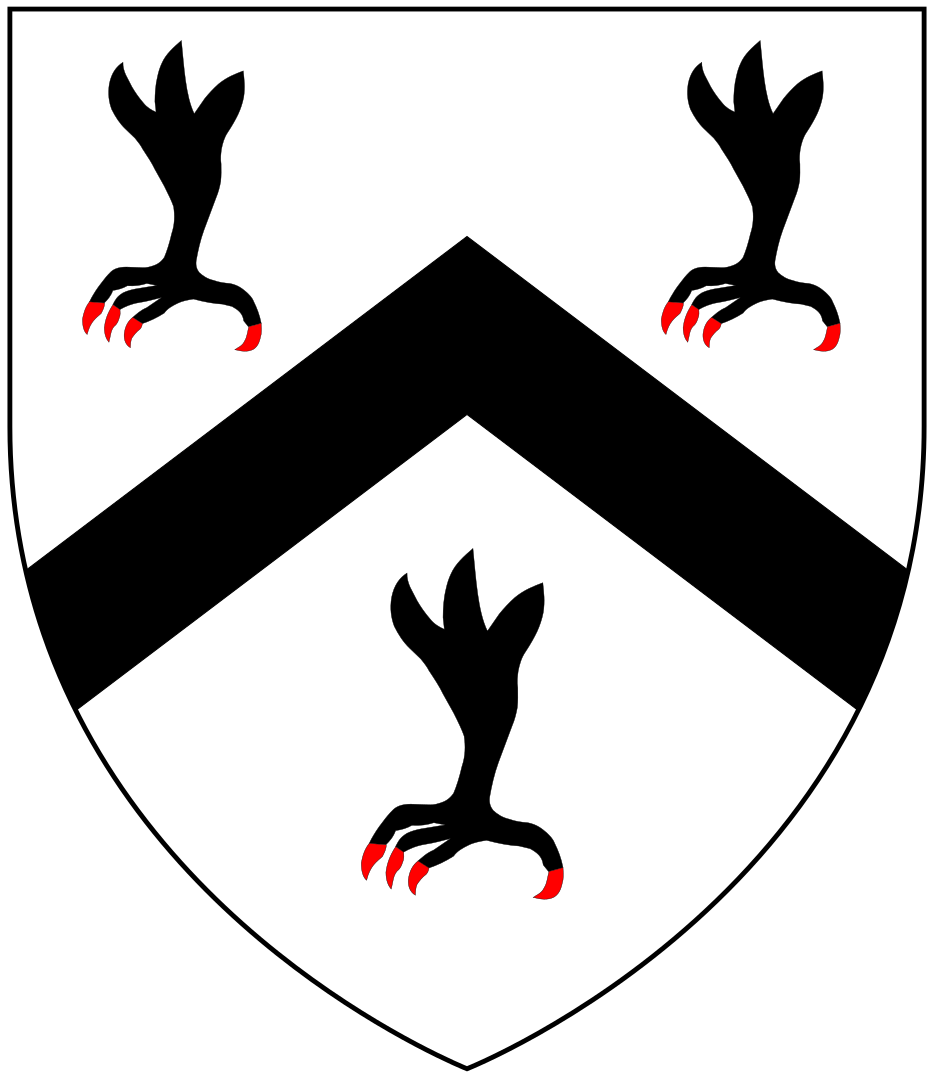
Arms of Bray: Argent, a chevron between three eagle's legs erased sable, as shown on monuments to Nicholas Eveleigh and Elize Hele in Bovey Tracey Church

He married Alice Bray, a daughter of Reginald Bray of Northamptonshire, a relative of Sir Reginald Bray (c. 1440 – 1503), KG, who bore the same arms, Chancellor of the Duchy of Lancaster under Henry VII. She survived him and remarried to the lawyer Elize Hele (1560–1635), founder of Plympton Grammar School, who continued to reside with her at Parke, and whose monument with semi-recumbent effigy survives on the south side of the chancel in Bovey Tracey Church, looking directly across the altar to the effigy of Eveleigh.

== Death ==
The timber-constructed Chagford Stannary Courthouse is believed to have stood on the southern side of Chagford Square, next to the present Three Crowns Hotel. It collapsed in 1617, killing Eveleigh, two of his clerks and seven others, also leaving a further 17 injured. The cause is believed to have been overcrowding and overloading of the floor timbers. Other theories have been suggested including earthquake and the curse of a dissatisfied defendant who "invoked the fates by asserting if his claims (which apparently were fantastical) weren't just that the court house might fall about his ears". The courthouse was later rebuilt on the lower side of the square. The source of the story is stated by Worth to be "a scarce black-letter tract" entitled "The True Relation of the Accident at Chagford in Devonshire", which relates how "the market-house fell in presently after dinner upon a Tin Court daie and Mr Eveleigh the Steward with nine others died".

== Monument ==
His monument on the north side of the chancel of Bovey Tracey Church is believed to have been made by the Exeter sculptor John Deymond who is recorded in the List of Freemen of the City of Exeter in 1597 as the apprentice of Richard Deymond. The monument has the "blunt inscription" 1620 ID on an otherwise blank panel above the effigy, and is similar in many respects to the monument to Sir John Acland (1552–1620) in Broadclyst church, also thought to have been made by John Deymond.
