= Elize Hele =

English lawyer and philanthropist (1560-1635)

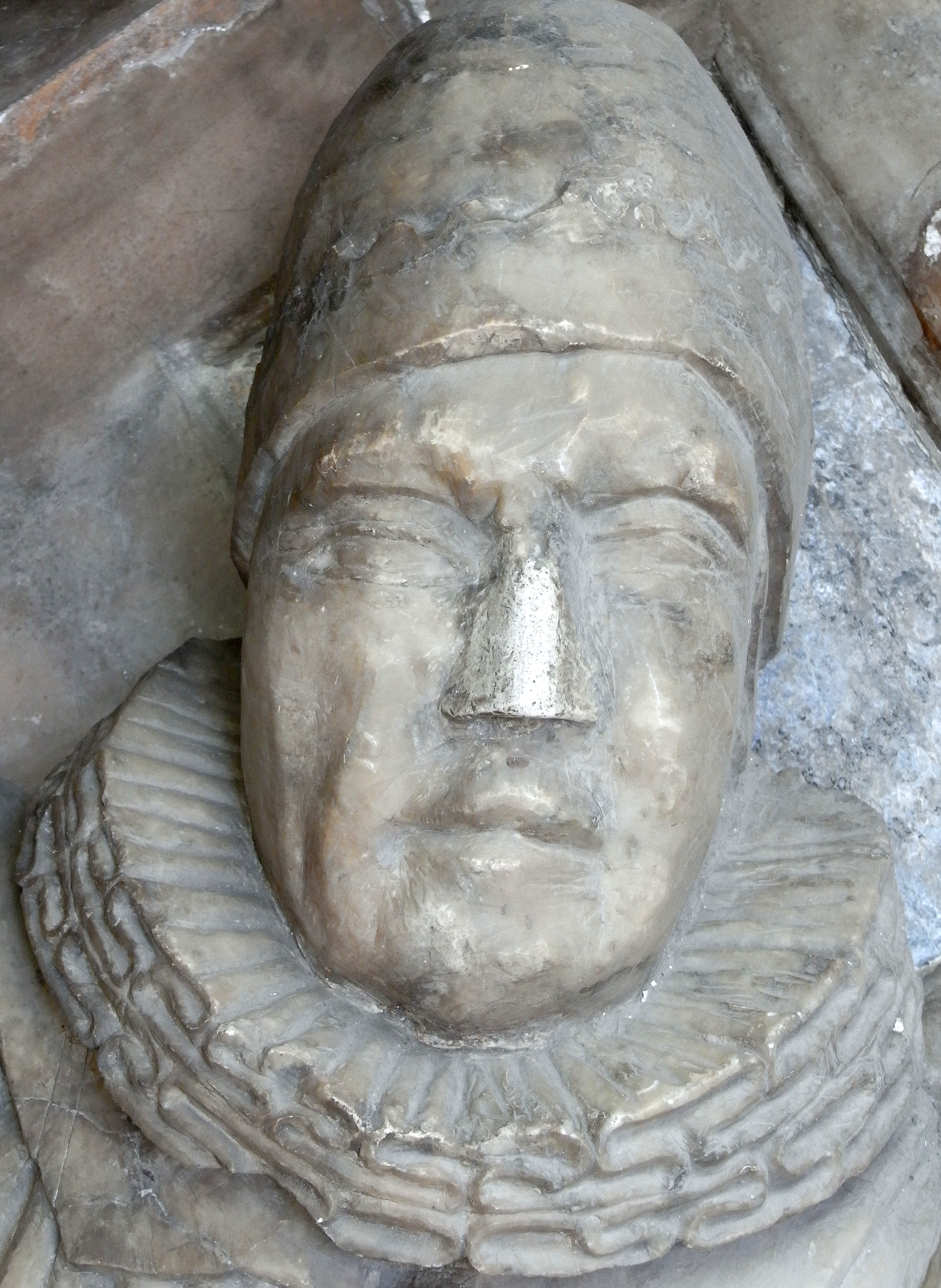
Elize Hele, detail from his alabaster effigy, Bovey Tracey Church

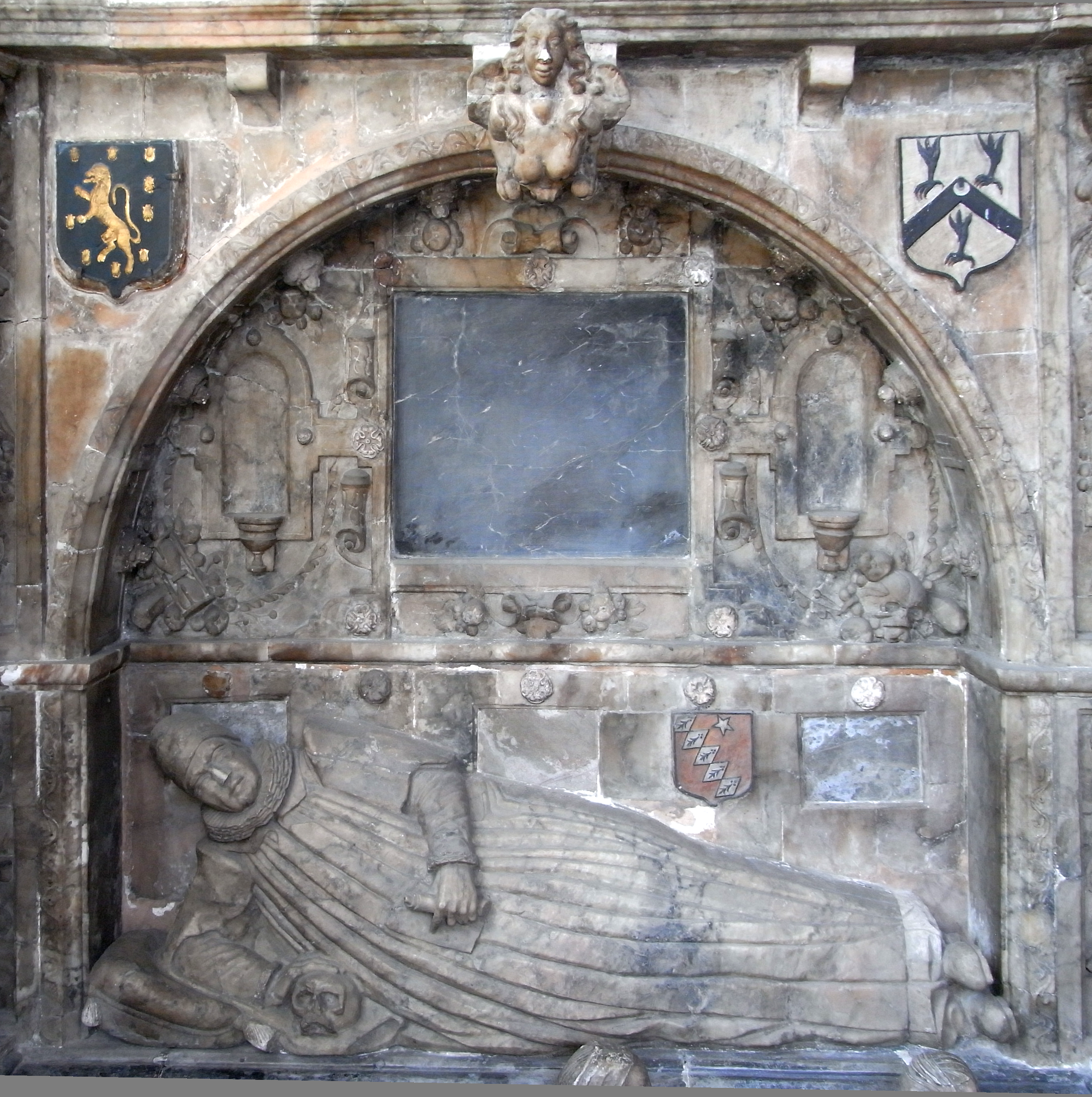
Monument to Elize Hele, Bovey Tracey Church. His semi-recumbent alabaster effigy holds a roll of parchment in the left hand, the right hand rests on a skull. Immediately above him are shown the arms of Hele (with a mullet for the difference of a 3rd son), with the arms of Hender (1st wife) at dexter top (Azure, a lion rampant between an orle of escallops or), and those of Bray (2nd wife) at sinister top (Argent, a chevron between three eagle's legs erased sable). Above is a tablet (inscription worn off) surrounded by strapwork decoration

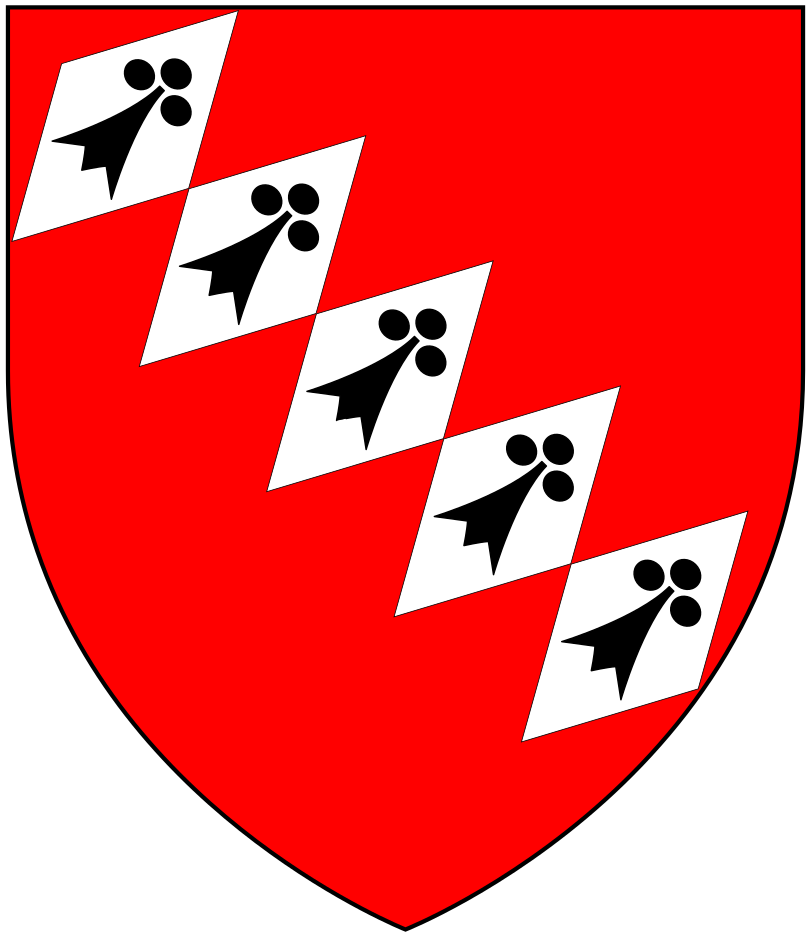
Arms of Hele: Gules, five fusils in bend argent on each an ermine spot

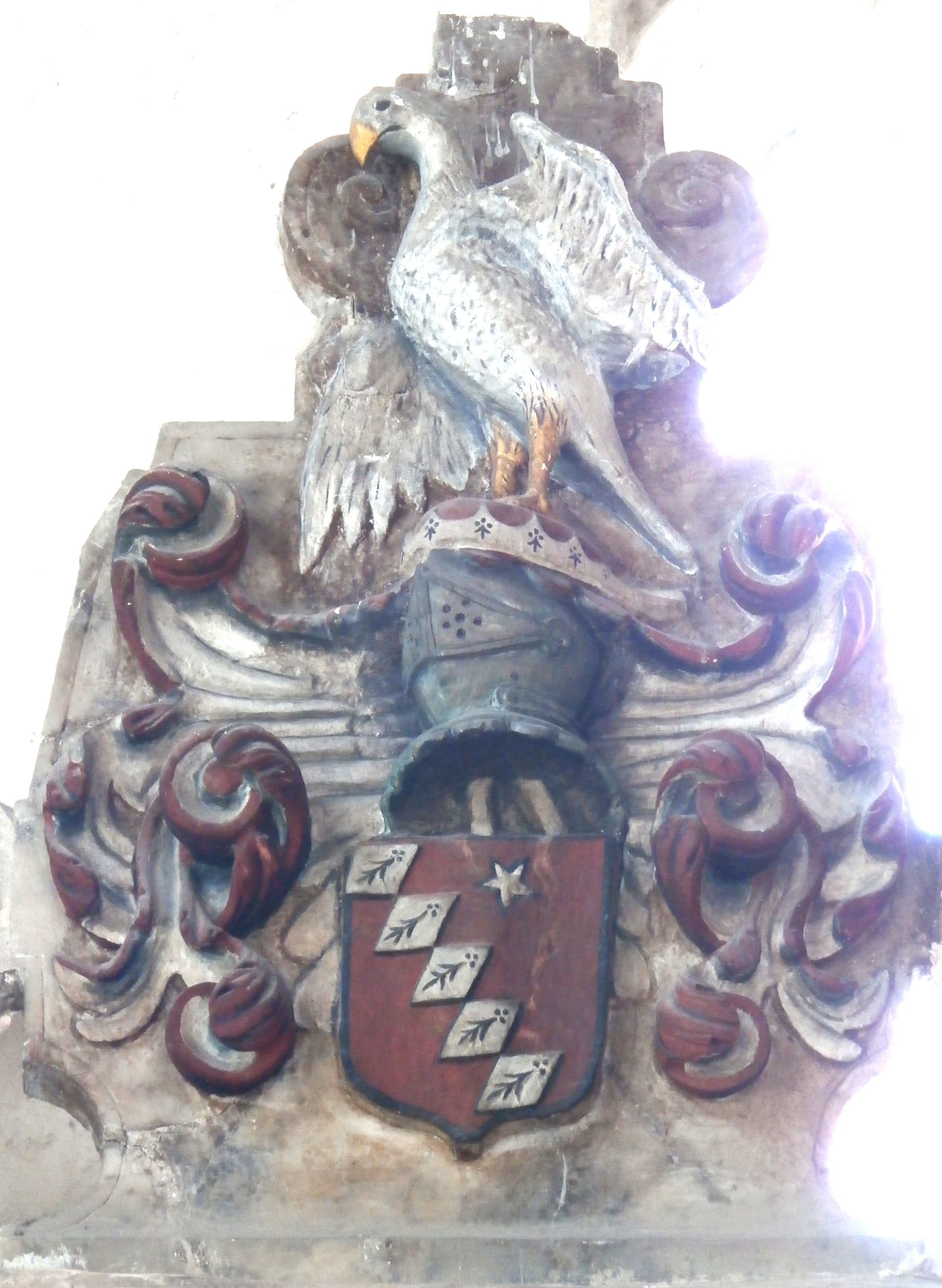
Heraldic achievement of Elize Hele, top of monument in Bovey Tracey Church. Crest: On a chapeau gules turned up ermine, an eagle close argent. Use of a cap of maintenance in a crest in place of the usual torse on top of the helm, denotes a special privilege

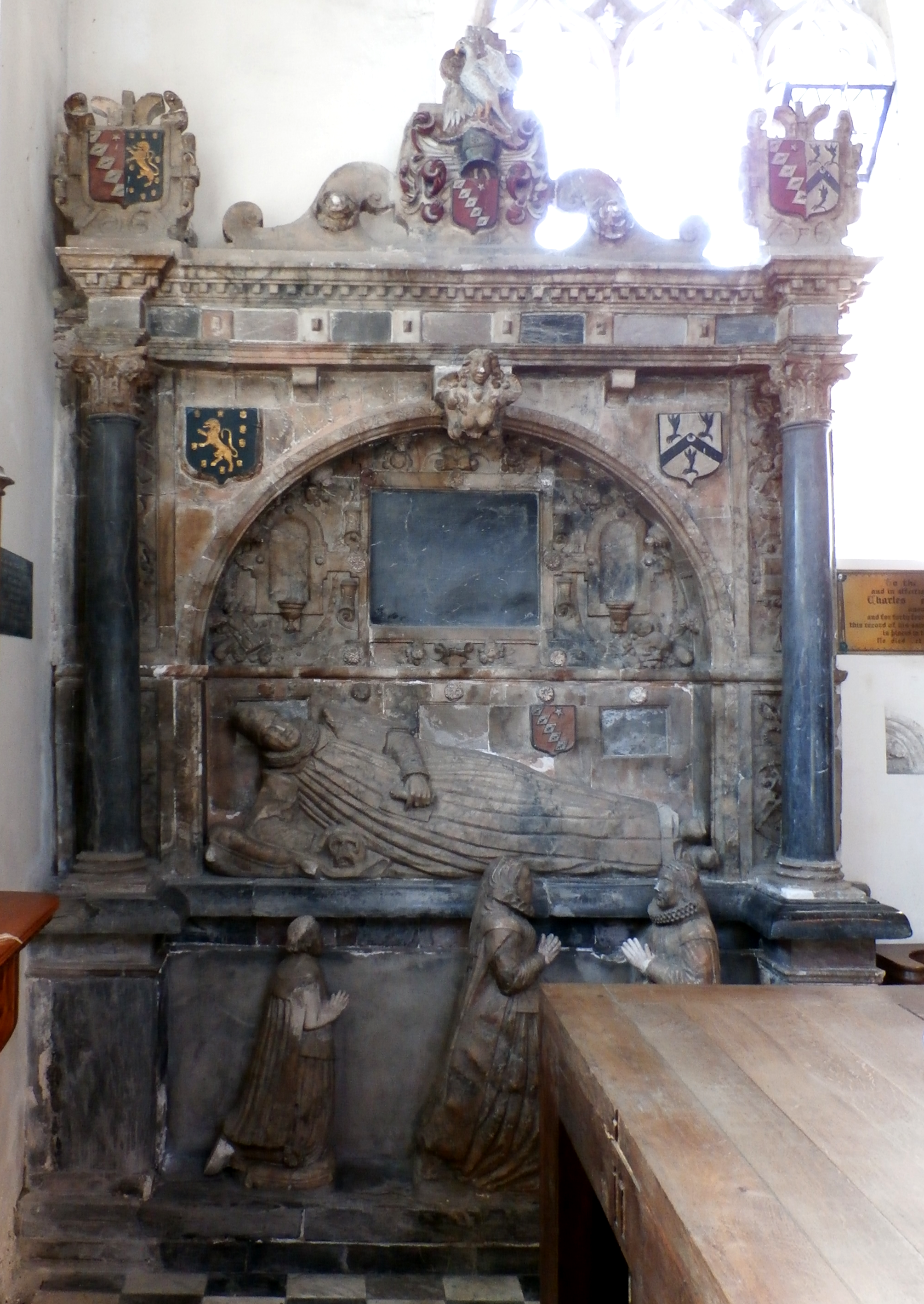
Monument to Elize Hele in Bovey Tracy Church, Devon. Below his effigy are the kneeling effigies of his two wives, facing each other in prayer, behind the left one kneels his young son. On top at each side is an escutcheon displaying the arms of Hele impaling Hender (dexter) and Bray (sinister)

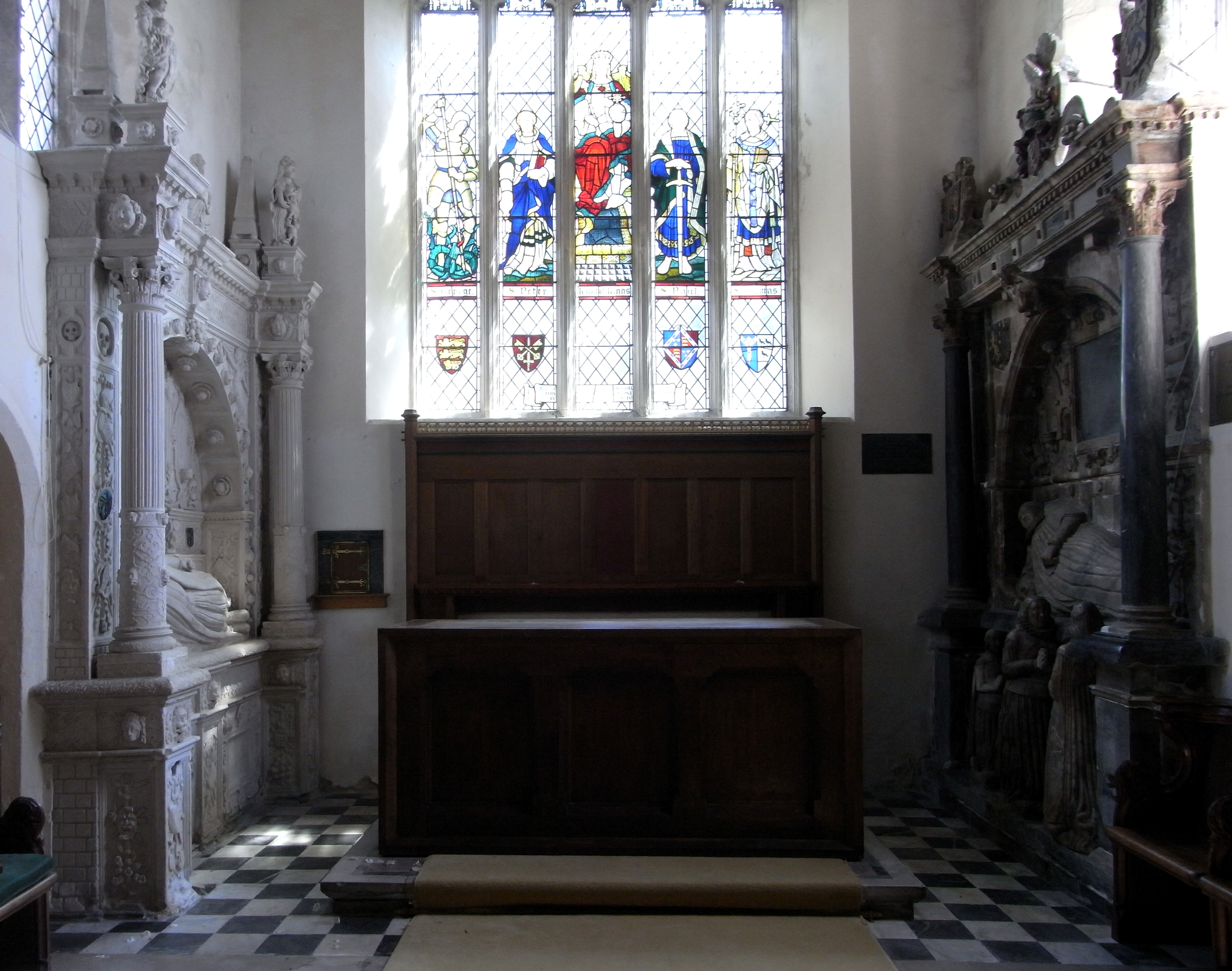
View into the chancel of Bovey Tracey Church, showing on the south (right) the monument to Elize Hele and on the north, place of greatest honour (left), Nicholas Eveleigh, whose widow Alice Bray remarried to Hele. The arms of Bray appear on both monuments

Elize Hele (1560–1635) (alias Ellis, Latinized to Elizeus) of Fardel in the parish of Cornwood, Devon and of Parke in the parish of Bovey Tracey, Devon, was an English lawyer and philanthropist. In 1632 he transferred his lands into a trust intended for "pious uses", from which charitable action and in order to distinguish him from his many prominent relations, he became known to posterity as "Pious Uses Hele", which his biographer Prince looked upon "as a more honourable appellation than the greatest empty title". The trustees included his wife, together with John Hele and a number of friends. The trust was used to create a number of schools in Devon including Plympton Grammar School (founded 1658, built 1664) (alias Hele's School).

== Origins ==
Hele was born in 1560 at Worston (or Winston) in the parish of Brixton near Plympton, Devon. He was the elder of two sons of Walter Hele of Brixton by his wife Jone (or Jane) Maynard, a daughter of Thomas Maynard of Brixton. His uncle was the very wealthy lawyer John Hele (d.1608), of Wembury, Devon, Recorder of Exeter in 1592, and Member of Parliament for Exeter 1593–1601, who married a daughter of Ellis (alias Elizeus) Warwick of Holbeton. The Hele family originated at the manor of Hele in the parish of Cornwood.

== Marriages and children ==
He married twice:

- Firstly to Mary Hender, daughter and co-heiress of John Hender of Bottreaux Castle in Cornwall. The arms of Hender (Azure, a lion rampant between an orle of escallops or) appear on Hele's monument. By his first wife he had a son:
  - Walter Hele (1611-1624), who died aged 13 and whose kneeling effigy appears at the base of his father's monument in Bovey Tracey Church.
- Secondly in 1618/19 to Alice Bray (d.1636), a daughter of Reginald Bray of Northamptonshire (probably a relative of Sir Reginald Bray (c.1440-1503), KG, Chancellor of the Duchy of Lancaster under Henry VII (same arms)) and widow of Nicholas Eveleigh (1562-1618), of Bovey Tracey, whose sumptuous monument survives in Bovey Tracey Church, in the principal place of honour on the north side of the chancel (facing directly across the altar to Hele's later monument). He was the 5th son of John Eveleigh of Holcombe in the parish of Ottery St Mary, Devon, was Steward of Devon Stannaries, and died when the roof of Chagford Stannary Court collapsed in 1618, killing nine other people. The arms of Bray (Argent, a chevron between three eagle's legs erased sable) appear on the monuments of both Eveleigh and Hele.

== Career ==
Hele was a lawyer of the Inner Temple in London. He was called to the bar in 1590 and to the bench in 1603. He was the treasurer to James I. He was a major landowner in south and west Devon. After his only child, Walter, died at the age of eleven, Hele decided to bequeath a number of his estates for "some godly purposes and charitable uses".

A deed was signed on 9 January 1632 between Elize Hele, John Maynard, later Sir John Maynard, John Hele and Elize Stert in which Elize Hele dedicated his estate to charitable and godly use. Elize Hele included the manors of Fardel, Dinnaton, Brixton Reigny, Coffleet, Halwill, Teignharvey, Clyst St Lawrence and Clyst Gerrard and Woolvington rectory and St Giles in the Heath.

== Death and burial ==
He died in 1635 and was buried in St. Andrew's Chapel (the "Cannons' Vestry") in Exeter Cathedral, as was also his wife when she died on 20 June 1636. His elaborate monument with semi-recumbent alabaster effigy survives on the south side of the chancel in Bovey Tracey Church, opposite that of Nicholas Eveleigh, his second wife's first husband.

== Legacy ==
His will took some time to settle. Twenty years later, his will was challenged in the House of Commons by his great niece Joane Hele (the granddaughter of Elize's brother Nicholas Hele, and the wife of Captain Edmond Lister) who petitioned the court to allow funds from the will to be redirected to her. Hele's executor, Sir John Maynard, was neutral to the outcome and Sir Edward Rhodes ruled that funds should be given to Joane but that the charitable causes should not be abandoned.

In 1649 John Maynard and Elize Stert, as surviving trustees, granted the lands and profits of the estate to be enjoyed by the governors, assistants and wardens of the Hospital of the Poors Portion, Plymouth, for the education of poor children. John Maynard and Elize Stert had also purchased in 1656, on behalf of the Hele Charity trust, an estate at Lower Creeson, Mary Tavy. Yearly accounts were compiled each November and money was to be used to build a schoolhouse at Plympton St Maurice and to buy lands at Brixton to support the preaching minister.

In 1656 his trustees, Sir John Maynard and Elize Stert apportioned money for the founding of the Blue Maid's Hospital (later renamed "The Maynard School") and in 1658 for the establishing of Hele's School in Plympton.

An indenture of 17–18 December 1658 between the Hele Charity trustees and the City of Exeter and governors of St John's Foundlings Hospital, Exeter, granted the profits of the manors of Clyst St Lawrence, Clyst St Gerrard and Teignharvey, as well as of Torre House, Newton Ferrers, to the Hospital, for the maintenance of the poor children. The heirs of Sir John Maynard were John Kerr, Earl of Ancram (later 7th Marquess of Lothian), Lady Suffield, Ernest Edgcumbe, Viscount Valletort (later 3rd Earl of Mount Edgcumbe) and Viscountess Castlereagh.

Sir John Maynard's descendants received the remaining income from the bequest and distributed it to charities as they decided for the next two centuries. Legal proceedings resulted in depriving the descendant of Sir J. Maynard, who was the surviving trustee, of all control over the funds, which were thereupon vested in the Crown.
