= Adam Ralegh =

16th-century English politician

Adam Ralegh (c. 1480 – 1545 or later), of Fardel and Plympton St Mary, Devon; London, and Southwark, Surrey, was an English politician.

He was a member (MP) of the Parliament of England for Totnes in 1529.
