= European Opportunities Trust =

British investment trust

European Opportunities Trust PLC
- Formerly: Jupiter European Opportunities Trust PLC (2000–2019)
- Type: Public limited company
- Traded as: LSE: EOT
- Industry: Investment trust
- Founded: August 16, 2000; 25 years ago
- Founders: Alexander Darwall
- Headquarters: British
- Website: devonem.com

European Opportunities Trust PLC (LSE: EOT) is a British investment trust dedicated to investments in securities of European companies and in sectors or geographical areas which are considered by the Investment Manager to offer good prospects for capital growth, taking into account economic trends and business development. It is listed on the London Stock Exchange.

== History ==
The company was established in 2000 and it has been managed since launch by Alexander Darwall, Chief Investment Officer of Devon Equity Management Limited.

The company changed its name from Jupiter European Opportunities Trust to European Opportunities Trust in November 2019 when the portfolio manager, Alexander Darwall, moved from Jupiter Asset Management Limited to establish Devon Equity Management Limited together with colleagues, Luca Emo Capodilista and Richard Pavry.

On 29 May 2026, following a strategic review, the company announced that it would wind down its portfolio and that shareholders would be offered shares in JPMorgan European Growth & Income.

The chairman is Matthew Dobbs and the other non-executive directors are Jeroen Huysinga, Sharon Brown, Lord Lamont of Lerwick and Virginia Holmes.
