= Yondertown =

Hamlet in Devon, England

Coordinates: 50.41°N 03.98°W

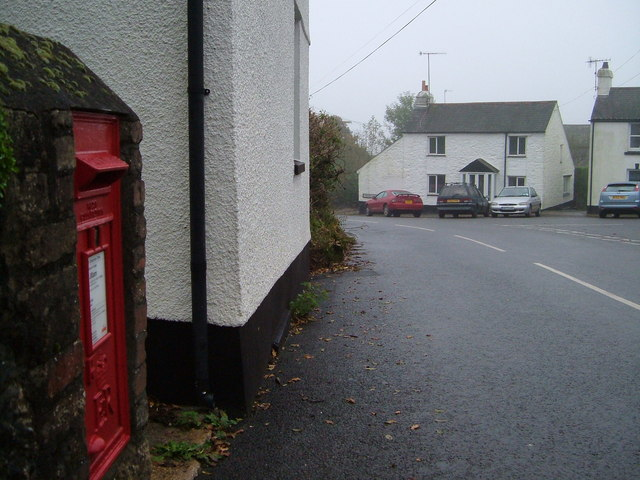
- Yondertown

- Location within Devon
- OS grid reference: SX5959
- District: South West England
- Shire county: Devon
- Region: South West
- Country: England
- Sovereign state: United Kingdom
- Post town: IVYBRIDGE
- Postcode district: PL21
- Police: Devon and Cornwall
- Fire: Devon and Somerset
- Ambulance: South Western
- UK Parliament: South West Devon

Yondertown is a mining hamlet located in an Area of Great Landscape Value on the edge of Dartmoor National Park in the English county of Devon. The community has close connections with the hamlet of Lutton and the nearby village of Cornwood. A mobile library, run by Devon County Council, stops in Yondertown every other Friday.
