= JPMorgan European Growth & Income =

British investment trust

- Type: Public company
- Traded as: LSE: JEGI; FTSE 250 Index component
- ISIN: GB00BPR9Y246
- Industry: Investment trust
- Founded: 1929; 97 years ago
- Headquarters: 25 Bank Street, Canary Wharf, London, England
- Key people: Rita Dhut (Chairman)

JPMorgan European Growth and Income (LSE: JEGI) is a large British investment trust. Established in 1929, it is dedicated to investing in European companies. The chairman is Rita Dhut. It is listed on the London Stock Exchange and FTSE Russell announced on 19 March 2025 that it would become a constituent of the FTSE 250 Index on 24 March 2025.

== History ==
The company was established as the London and Holyrood Trust in 1929. Following the appointment of Robert Fleming & Co. as manager, it became the Fleming Universal Investment Trust in 1982 and went on to become the Fleming Continental European Investment Trust in 1992. After Robert Fleming & Co. was acquired by Chase Manhattan in April 2000, and Chase Manhattan merged with J.P. Morgan & Co. in December 2000, it was brought under the management of J.P. Morgan & Co. In anticipation of JPMorgan's decision to drop the Fleming brand, it became the JPMorgan Continental European Investment Trust 2003. It changed its name to the JPMorgan European Investment Trust in 2006, before adopting its current name in 2022.

On 29 May 2026, European Opportunities Trust announced that, following a strategic review, it would wind down its portfolio and that its shareholders would be offered shares in JPMorgan European Growth & Income.
