= Gordon Shattock =

British politician (1928–2010)

Sir Gordon Shattock (12 May 1928 – 10 April 2010) was a British veterinarian who served as the Conservative Party's Western-area Chairman. He survived the 1984 Brighton bombing, which claimed the life of his first wife, Jeanne. He suffered sensory damage to his vision and hearing.

A native of Exeter, Shattock was educated at Hele's School. He studied veterinary science at the Royal Veterinary College in London and worked in that profession in his native city for more than three decades. He was forced to retire after the bombing due to the injuries he had sustained in the blast.

He met his second wife, Wendy, at Exeter Cathedral, where his wife's memorial service was held in December 1984. They married four years later. He chaired the Exeter Cathedral Music Foundation Trust until 2004.

He died aged 81 at The Lodge nursing home in Exeter, survived by his wife and his two children from his first marriage.
