= Dendles Wood =

Protected woodland in Devon, England

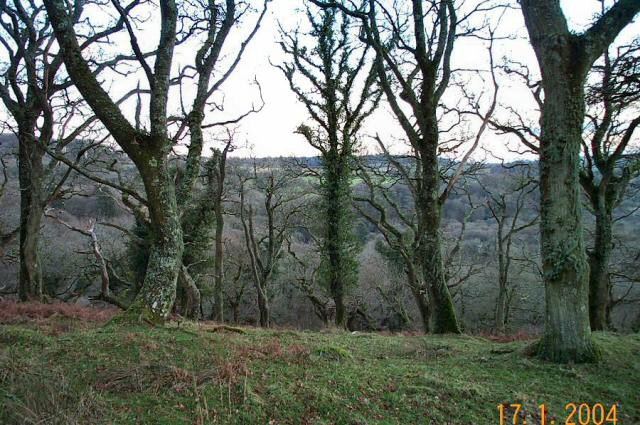

- Location within Dartmoor
- Interactive map of Dendles Wood

Geography
- Location: Devon, England
- OS grid: SX6161
- Coordinates: 50.43°N 3.95°W
- Area: 50.4 hectares (124.5 acres)

Dendles Wood is an area of protected oak-beech woodland located on the southern edge of Dartmoor, in the English county of Devon. Forming part of the Dartmoor Special Area of Conservation, the wood is also a Site of Special Scientific Interest, and 30 hectares of it has been designated a national nature reserve. It is one of five woodlands within Dartmoor that have been protected as national nature reserves. Dendles Wood and the adjacent Hawns Wood are sometimes known collectively as Hawns and Dendles. The wood supports a variety of flora and fauna, representative of upland oakwoods. In particular, it has a rich variety of moss and lichen, and several breeding bird species.

== Geography ==
Dendles Wood is situated on the southern edge of Dartmoor, covering the slopes of the valley around the confluence of Broadall Lake and Ford Brook with the River Yealm. It is about 3 kilometres (1.9 mi) north of the village of Cornwood. This village is the nearest stopping point for travel to the wood by car or by bus. In total, Dendles Wood covers 50.4 hectares (124.5 acres). The River Yealm runs through the middle of the wood. A path leads through the adjacent Hawns Wood onto open moorland.

The wood is located at an altitude of between 160 metres (525 ft) and 280 metres (919 ft).

The parent rock is granite, with some slate in the southern parts of the wood.

== Ecology ==
=== Flora ===
Dendles Wood is a representative example of upland oakwood, consisting predominantly of pedunculate oak. However, there are also a number of beech trees, located to the east and south-west of the wood and growing in number. Beech is a genus that is not thought to be a native to any other part of Dartmoor. There are also a few species of shrub found throughout the wood, namely the common hazel, European holly and rowan.

As with Dartmoor's other upland oakwoods, the cool, moist and well-lit environment has enabled a rich variety of mosses and lichens to grow. Natural England has established a monitoring system for the latter, due to the presence of two particularly rare species: Graphina ruiziana, of which there is a greater quantity than any other South West location, and Cetrelia cetrarioides, which is found in other Dartmoor woodlands as well. The more common species in the wood are Parmelia laevigata and Usnea florida. In terms of moss, Rhytidiadelphus squarrosus and Thuidium tamariscinum are both present. Other varieties, such as Isothecium myosuroides, Dicranum scoparium, Polytrichum formosum and Plagiothecium undulatum, can be found on rocks.

=== Fauna ===
Dendles Wood is home to a breeding colony of barbastelles, one of Britain's rarest species of bat. As they were first discovered in the area in 2002, after the designation of the Dartmoor Special Area of Conservation, the bats are not a 'qualifying feature' of the SAC, but Natural England has suggested that this is likely to change following the site's next review.

Several breeding bird species, typical in upland oakwoods, can be seen in Dendles Wood. Species include the common buzzard, wood warbler, redstart and pied flycatcher, as well as the white-throated dipper and grey wagtail that nest alongside the woodland rivers. A nestbox scheme for the pied flycatcher operates in Dendles and a few other Dartmoor woodlands.

Butterflies found in the woods include the silver-washed fritillary and green hairstreak species. Red deer and fallow deer are both frequent visitors to the area.

== History ==
Dendles Wood is an ancient woodland. According to the title deeds of Blachford Manor, the wood was formerly known as 'Daniels', probably in reference to a former landowner; 'Dendles' is almost certainly a corruption of this name. For much of its history since the medieval period, the wood has been used for coppice. In particular, when mines on Dartmoor were active, oak coppice was used to produce charcoal for smelting. At the end of the nineteenth century, with the decline in the mining industry, the demand for coppice products ceased and Dendles Wood was no longer used for this purpose.

Instead, Hawns and Dendles, which was part of the Blachford Estate, became a popular tourist location, opened to the public on Mondays, Wednesdays and Saturdays. At the turn of the century, the United Devon Association described it as 'one of the most charming sylvan spots in the whole of Devonshire'.

During the 1930s, Dendles Wood was also passed through as part of the Dartmoor Hunt, when starting at Wisdome Mill or Cornwood Common.

In October 1965, the Nature Conservancy purchased 29 hectares (72 acres) of the wood from the Economic Forestry Group, to create the Dendles Wood National Nature Reserve. Since this point, access to the Dendles Wood reserve has been restricted; permits for access are granted by the Natural England Site Manager. Restrictions also apply to livestock, which are not permitted within the wood; heavy grazing in the past has adversely affected the shrub layer. In 1986, the wood was notified as a Site of Special Scientific Interest, which was later expanded with part of the Hawns Wood and High House Moor SSSI.

== Literary descriptions ==
In his 1909 novel The Three Brothers, Dartmoor author Eden Phillpotts described Dendles Wood as follows:

In the glen beneath spread Dendles Wood, with fringes of larch and pine hiding the River Yealm and spreading a verdant medley of deep summer green in the lap of the grey hills.
