= Alexander Darwall =

British landowner and hedge fund manager (born 1963)

Alexander Frederick Clifford Darwall
- Born: June 1963 (age 63)
- Education: University of Cambridge
- Occupation: Fund Manager

Alexander Frederick Clifford Darwall (born June 1963) is a British landowner and hedge fund manager. He has held roles in several large investment companies. He has made donations to UKIP and the Vote Leave campaign. In 2025, he lost a legal action to limit public access to his land in Dartmoor.

== Education and early career ==
Darwall received a degree in History from the University of Cambridge. He then trained as an investment analyst with de Zoete & Bevan (BZW). In 1987, Darwall moved to Paris to become head of the French equity research department for the Swedish group Enskilda Securities. In 1992, he joined Goldman Sachs as a French equity analyst.

== Career ==
In 1995, Darwall joined Jupiter Fund Management. In November 2000, Jupiter European Opportunities was founded and Darwall became the lead portfolio manager. Darwall remained in this role until November 2019, when Jupiter European became European Opportunities Trust PLC, and Darwall stepped down as manager of both Jupiter European and the related Jupiter European Growth investment companies.

In 2019, he founded a company known as Devon Equity Management, whose aim is to "achieve long term capital growth by exploiting special investment opportunities in Europe". Darwall continues to manage the company. Devon Equity Management invests on behalf of the European Opportunities Trust, as well as Luxembourg UCITS SICAV.

In June 2025, Darwall sold Devon Equity Management to River Global, owned by Martin Gilbert, for £2.46 million. As part of the acquisition, Darwall will join River Global as co-head of European equities.

== Land ownership ==
Darwall owns several large tracts of land across the UK. One of these is the 16,000 acre Sutherland Estate in Scotland, which he bought in November 2016 for around £5 million. He and his wife entered the national news in 2018 after they started charging gold panners £10 per day, limiting their access area, and limiting their time to two weeks per year, as people were selling the gold, which is not something they believe should be permitted.

=== Dartmoor ===
Darwall has owned the 4,000 acre Blachford Estate in Dartmoor since 2011. This makes him the sixth largest landowner on Dartmoor. Darwall's Blachford Estate received financial support from the European Agricultural Fund for Rural Development. In 2014, Darwall blocked the public from parking on or riding horses through a section of his land at New Waste.

In 2022, he received media attention for challenging the widely held interpretation of the Dartmoor Commons Act 1985 as including a public right to wild camping on the moor. Historically, wild camping, where no damage has been caused, had been presumed lawful on Dartmoor. In January 2023, the High Court found in Darwall's favour, clarifying that there was no right to wild camp on Dartmoor without the landowner's permission; it was previously the only location in England and Wales where camping without the permission of the landowner was presumed to be legal.

Following the high court decision, Darwall and other landowners struck a deal with the Dartmoor National Park Authority, where they would be paid compensation in return for allowing wild camping on limited portions of their land. The deal was met with disapproval from Right to Roam campaigners. On 21 January 2023, a protest was organised on Darwall's land to protest the decision, with more than 3,000 people in attendance, making it one of the largest countryside access protests since the 1930s. The park authority subsequently announced that it intended to appeal the High Court’s decision, which it subsequently won in a unanimous Court of Appeal ruling in July 2023, restoring access for wild campers. Following the Court of Appeal ruling, in early 2024 Darwall challenged the decision to overturn the ban and moved for the case to be heard in the Supreme Court.

In May 2025, Supreme Court judges unanimously rejected Darwall's appeal, basing their judgement around the Dartmoor by-law that states "the public shall have a right of access to the commons on foot and on horseback for the purpose of open-air recreation". The judges said that references to open-air recreation were "open-ended and unqualified" and "naturally includes camping".

Darwall argued that his aim of his court action was to protect and preserve Dartmoor, its flora and fauna, and hollowing out the roll of landowners and farmers will not improve the vitality of Dartmoor. Local residents have previously raised concerns that Darwall's release of pheasants onto his Dartmoor estate was leading to the endangerment of ecological woodland which is habitat for the Blue Ground Beetle, found in only 15 sites across England and Wales.

== Personal life ==
Darwall has donated £89,999 to the UK Independence Party, the Vote Leave campaign supporting a "Leave" vote in the 2016 United Kingdom European Union membership referendum, and the Conservatives between 2014 and 2019. Part of this money included a donation to Anthony Mangnall, the former Conservative MP for Totnes, Devon.

Darwall’s wife Diana is an expert on Chinese ceramics and values and auctions Chinese porcelain.
