= Piles Copse =

Protected area in Devon, England

Coordinates: 50°26′22″N 3°54′28″W

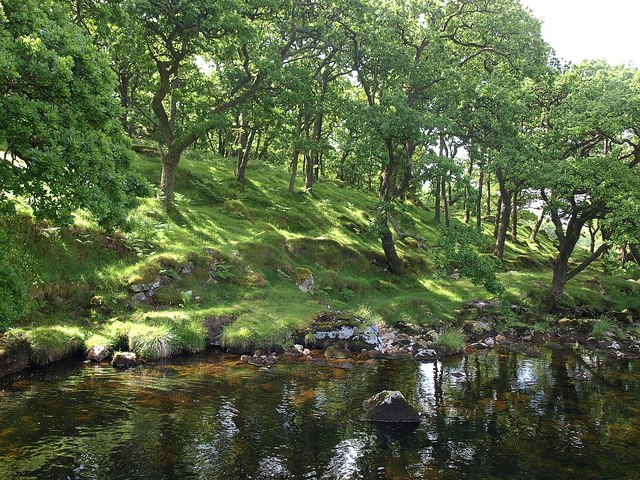
Piles Copse and the River Erme

Piles Copse is a Site of Special Scientific Interest (SSSI) within Dartmoor National Park in Devon, England. It is located 5km north of the town of Ivybridge in the valley of the River Erme, north of a stream called Piles Brook. This area is protected because it contains one of the few examples of ancient upland woodlands on Dartmoor and contains a high diversity of moss species.

Piles Copse SSSI is adjacent to South Dartmoor SSSI, and so forms part of a wider area of nature protection.

== Biology ==
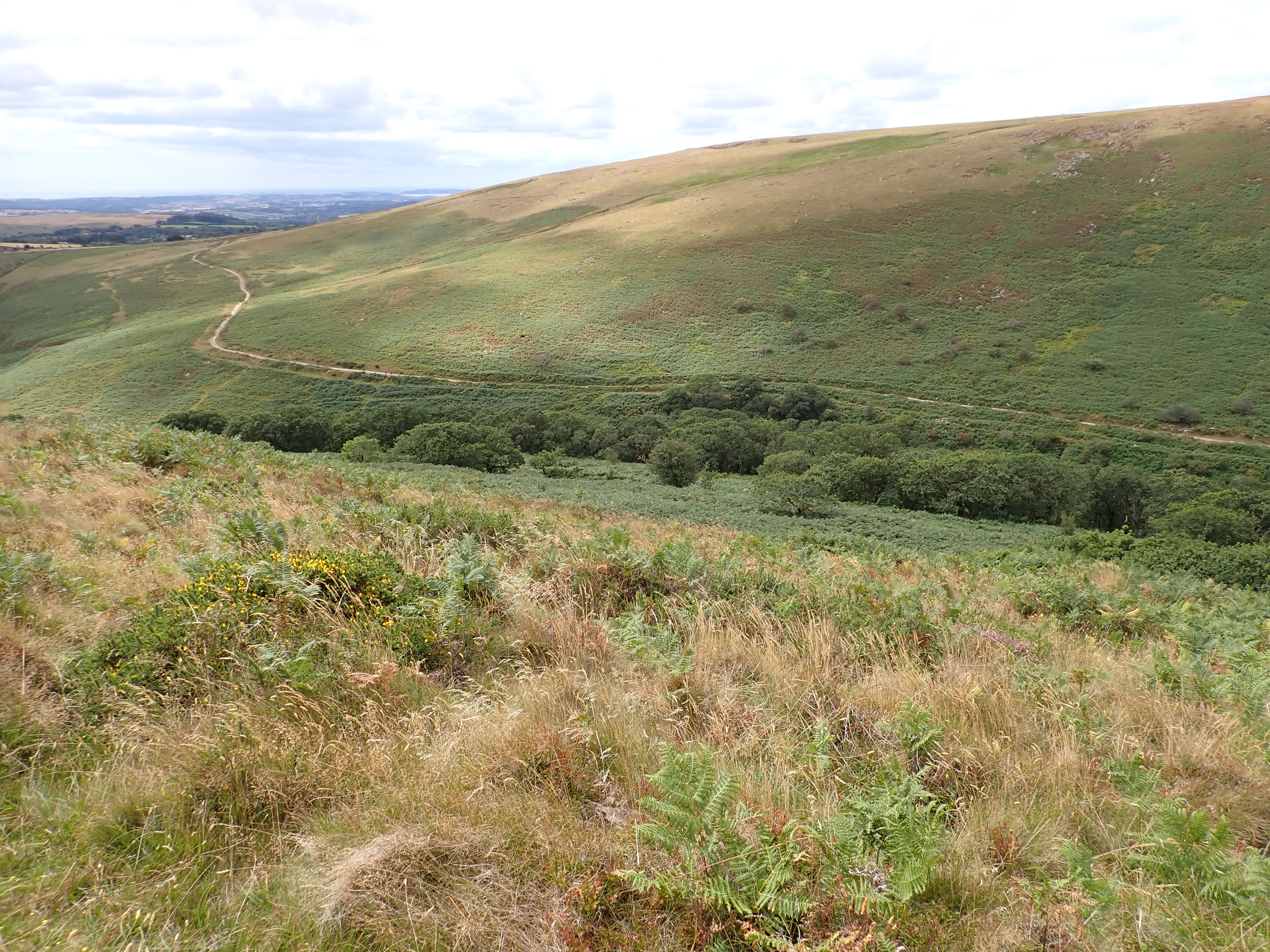
Piles Copse in valley of River Erme with Stalldown Barrow behind.

The woodland is dominated by pedunculate oak. Woodland herbs include wood-sorrel. Amongst granite boulders, mosses form a covering mat (species here include Hypnum cuppressiforme, Plagiothecium undulatum and Dicranum scoparium). Moss species also include Dicranum flagellare (genus Dicranum).

Liverworts in this woodland include Jamesoniella autumnalis and Harpanthus scutatus. Lichen species include Parmelia laevigata and Ochrolechia inversa.

== Archaeology ==
Scheduled monuments in this protected area include the remains of stone huts.

== Land ownership and management ==
Piles Copse SSSI is within the Harford Moor estate owned by the Howell family. Scientists from University of Plymouth have investigated the regeneration of oak species at Piles Copse SSSI, using some areas where grazers are excluded, and found that natural regeneration has an important role to play, but can require exclusion of livestock where saplings (1-3 years old) have become established. In 2013 the landowners developed a management plan for Piles Copse SSSI.
