= Dartmoor National Park Authority =

English national park authority

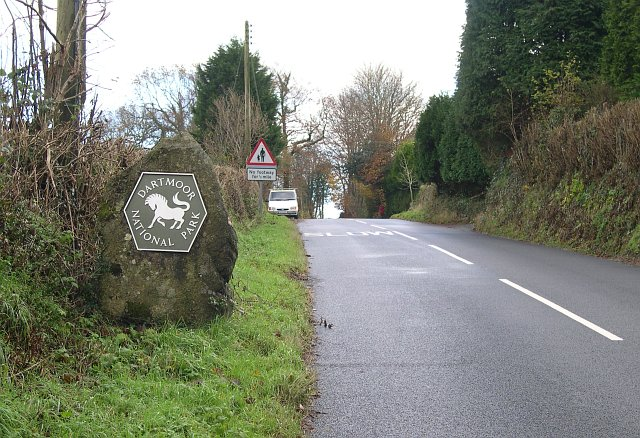
One of the Authority's signs at the boundary of the Park

The Dartmoor National Park Authority (DNPA) is a national park authority in England, legally responsible for Dartmoor in Devon. It came into existence in its present form in 1997, being preceded by a committee of Devon County Council (from 1951 to March 1974) and the Dartmoor National Park Committee from 1 April 1974.

== History ==
Dartmoor, in the county of Devon, is 368 square miles (950 km^{2}) in area. It was designated as one of the National Parks of England and Wales by statute in 1951; it has over 34,000 people living within its boundaries, and some 2.2 million people visited it in 2011.

=== First incarnation ===
For the first 23 years of its existence, Dartmoor National Park was administered by a special committee of Devon County Council, the "Dartmoor Sub-Committee". During this time the major proposals dealt with by the committee included extensions of china clay workings and coniferous plantations (which did not take place); the erection of a television transmitting mast at North Hessary Tor in 1953 (passed by the casting vote of the chairman); and proposals to construct three reservoirs, of which the Avon Dam Reservoir (mid-1950s) and the Meldon Reservoir (1972) were built, but one planned for the Swincombe Valley was rejected by a parliamentary committee in 1970, "on the grounds of the technical unsuitability of the scheme, not because it was sited in a national park".

In the 1960s three full-time park wardens were appointed, assisted by a number of voluntary wardens, whose job it was to "help and advise the public" and ensure compliance with local bye-laws. In addition, a temporary information centre was located at Two Bridges during the summer seasons.

=== Second incarnation ===
The Local Government Act 1972 resulted in a major change in the governance of national parks. The act established a National Park Committee for each park under the leadership of a named National Park Officer and 75% of each committee's agreed annual budget was to be met from central funds. Dartmoor National Park Committee (DNPC) was the first in the country to appoint a leader, in October 1973, and by the time the committee became operational on 1 April 1974, many of the necessary officers had already been appointed. A condition of the 1972 act was that each National Park Committee had to produce a management plan setting out its policies, implementation plans and proposed budget. The first Dartmoor National Park Plan was published in 1977; its stated aim was that the park would be "as tidy, enjoyable and uncontentious as possible". Reviews of the plan were produced in 1983 and 1991.

From the outset the DNPC decided that to encourage local landowners to manage their land for the public benefit, it should acquire land itself and use it to demonstrate good practices. To that end it bought the 1,040-acre (421-ha) Haytor Down when it came up for auction in 1974, followed by the purchase of a large part of Holne Moor in 1975 and the adjoining White Wood the following year, acquiring in the process the Lordship of the Manor of Holne. This acquisition means that the National Park Officer is also steward of the manor and is thus responsible for administering the common land there, ensuring that a close relationship is maintained with the commoners on its 1,935 acres (783 hectares).

=== Latest incarnation ===
The current National Park Authority owes its existence to the Environment Act 1995 which made it a fully independent "freestanding local authority" from 1 April 1997. Like the other twelve national park authorities in England and Wales, the DNPA has two "statutory purposes" which it must pursue. These are:

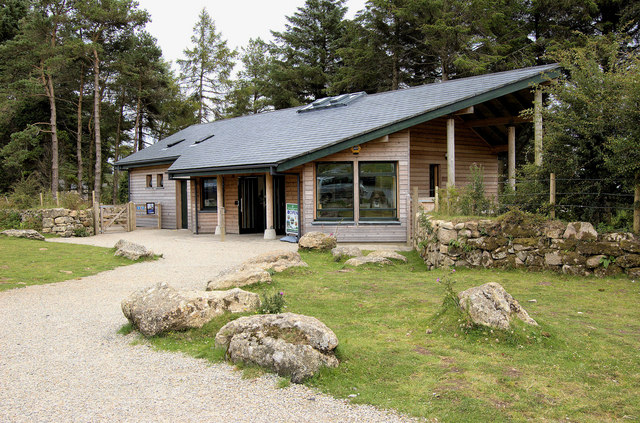
The Haytor information centre

- to conserve and enhance the natural beauty, wildlife and cultural heritage of the area, and
- to promote opportunities for the understanding and enjoyment of the park's special qualities by the public.

While upholding these statutory purposes it is also required to meet a socio-economic duty:

- to seek to foster the economic and social well-being of local communities within the National Park.

If conflict arises between the two statutory purposes, the act provides that the first purpose, that of conservation, must take precedence. This enshrines in law the Sandford Principle which was first set down in 1974.

To update its earlier management plans, the authority publishes a strategic plan, known as the Dartmoor National Park Management Plan, supplemented by local plans or a local development framework. It also publishes a bi-annual free newspaper known as The Dartmoor Guide and a number of factsheets on a range of relevant topics. Its budget for 2011/12 was £4.9m of which £4.5m came from Defra with the balance from income, grants, and fees and charges.

As of 2012 the DNPA employs about 105 staff and is governed by twenty-two appointed members who are normally appointed for an initial period of up to four years. Six of these members are appointed by Devon County Council; six come from the three district councils whose land includes parts of the moor; ten are government appointees of whom four represent moorland parish council interests; and finally, six (usually local) people with an interest in the park are directly appointed by the Secretary of State to represent the national interest. The absence of locally elected representatives on the board has been a source of complaint against the DNPA.

The authority now owns a total of 3,587 acres (1,452 hectares) of the park, the largest areas after Haytor Down and Holne Moor being 230 acres (93 hectares) at Plasterdown and 198 acres (80 hectares) at Dendles Wood. It operates three information centres within the park: the High Moorland Visitor Centre in Princetown (opened in 1993) and information centres at Postbridge and Haytor. Since 1979 its headquarters have been just outside the National Park boundary, at Parke in the town of Bovey Tracey.

== Some recent activities ==
To celebrate the 50th anniversary of the designation of Dartmoor as a national park, in 2001 the DNPA planned a number of initiatives. These included "Moor Memories", an oral history project which aimed to capture the voices and memories of the people of Dartmoor, building on similar projects undertaken by the Authority and others in the 1980s and earlier.

In 2003 DNPA started to subsidise moorland farmers to keep Dartmoor Ponies in an attempt to save the breed after new European legislation increased the costs of keeping them. In 2010 it submitted written evidence to Parliament about its concern for the long-term viability of hill farming on Dartmoor.

The Authority announced in April 2004 that it was microchipping about 200 granite artifacts on the moor, including crosses, to deter theft and aid the recovery of any that might be stolen.

In January 2012 the Authority stated that due to the loss of 28% of its budget in the Government's 2010 Spending Review, it intended to start charging for car-parking on its land during the summer season. The cuts also meant that its regular series of guided walks on the moor would be provided by an independent company from April 2012.

== Sources ==
- Greeves, Tom (29 September 2001). ""'twas purty to hear the jumpers going" - Dartmoor National Park: a Culture Misplaced". The Dartmoor Society.
- Mercer, Ian (2009). Dartmoor - A Statement of its Time. The New Naturalist Library. Vol. 111. London: Collins. ISBN 978-0-00-718499-6.
