= Blachford Manor =

Country house in Cornwood, Devon, England

Coordinates: 50.4230°N 3.9547°W

Blachford Manor is a country house in Cornwood in Devon. It was the seat of the Rogers family. It is owned by Alexander Darwall. The house is at the centre of a 4,000 acre estate.

It is listed Grade II* on the National Heritage List for England. It was originally constructed in the 16th century, but extensively rebuilt in the 18th and early 19th centuries. The landscaped grounds were originally a deer park and were laid out in the 19th century, with the lake being created in 1827 by James Green.

The house has been noted by several antiquarians of Devon. In 1806 Richard Polwhele described Blachford as "well merits particular attention. Its situation is rather low and water too near the house but its extensive lawn and the groups of trees have a pleasing effect". In 1850 William White describe the house as a "large substantial mansion, in a delightful situation, commanding fine views". Frederick Stockdale wrote that it was "a spacious mansion-surrounded by an extensive demesne containing a variety of beautiful romantic scenes of an Alpine character".

A dispute over access to the estate between the Dartmoor National Park Authority and Darwall reached the Supreme Court of the United Kingdom in October 2024. In May 2025 the Supreme Court unanimously rejected Darwall's case, basing their judgement around the Dartmoor by-law that states "the public shall have a right of access to the commons on foot and on horseback for the purpose of open-air recreation". The judges said that references to open-air recreation were "open-ended and unqualified" and "naturally includes camping".
