= Great Trowlesworthy Tor =

Granite tor on Dartmoor in Devon, England

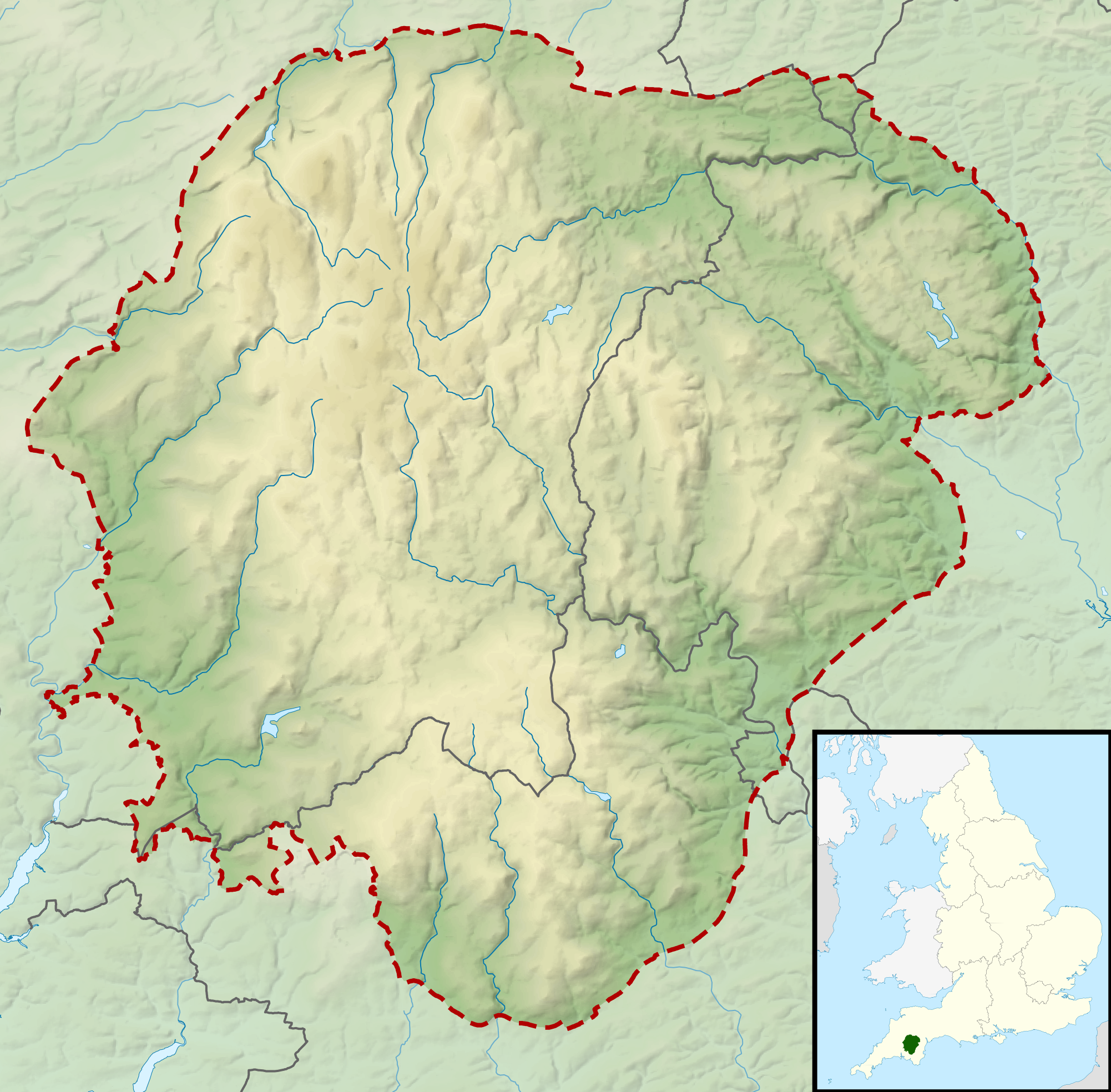
- Location within Dartmoor

Highest point
- Elevation: 357 m (1,171 ft)
- Coordinates: 50°27′43″N 4°00′09″W

Geography
- Location: Dartmoor, England
- OS grid: SX579643
- Topo map: OS Explorer OL28: Dartmoor

Climbing
- Easiest route: From Trowlesworthy Farm

Great Trowlesworthy Tor is a granite tor on the southwestern edge of Dartmoor. It is located near the popular Cadover Bridge and is a popular walking destination. It is common for the Dartmoor Pony and other cattle to be roaming around the tor. Little Trowlesworthy Tor, height 330m, is on its western slope and is known to hold a disused flagpole that was used to celebrate Devonport's independence from Plymouth in the 1920s.
