= Cornwood =

Village in Devon, England

Coordinates: 50.419°N 3.964°W

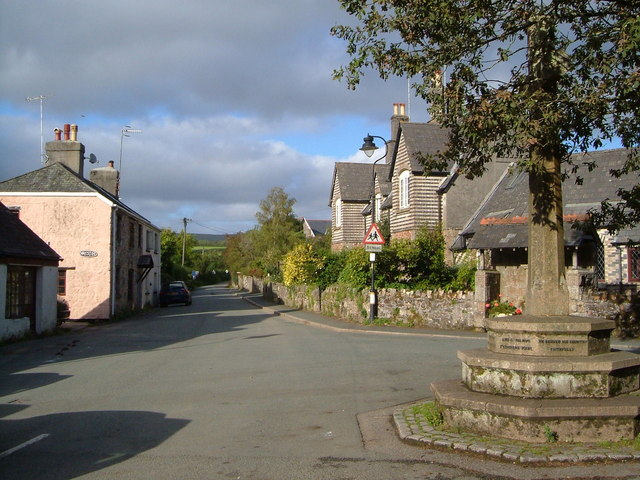
- Houses in Fore Street with the village cross

- Location within Devon
- Population: 988 (2001)
- OS grid reference: SX605598
  - London: 183 miles (295 km)
- Civil parish: Cornwood
- District: South Hams
- Shire county: Devon
- Region: South West
- Country: England
- Sovereign state: United Kingdom
- Post town: IVYBRIDGE
- Postcode district: PL21
- Dialling code: 01752
- Police: Devon and Cornwall
- Fire: Devon and Somerset
- Ambulance: South Western
- UK Parliament: South West Devon

Cornwood is a village and civil parish in the South Hams in Devon, England. The parish has a population of 988. The village is part of the electoral ward called Cornwood and Sparkwell. The ward population at the 2011 census was 2,321.

Blachford Manor stands in parkland on the northwest edge of the village, and is surrounded by a 4,000-acre (1,600-hectare) estate. It is owned by the financier Alexander Darwall who has been in dispute with the Dartmoor National Park Authority regarding access to wild camping on Dartmoor. 3,000 protesters gathered in Cornwood to march onto nearby Stall Moor on 21 January 2023. From 1852 to 1959, the village was served by Cornwood railway station on the South Devon Main Line between Exeter and Plymouth.

The civil parish includes the villages and hamlets of Lutton, Yondertown, North Hele, South Hele, Corntown, Uppaton, Tor, East Rook and West Rook.

== Religion ==
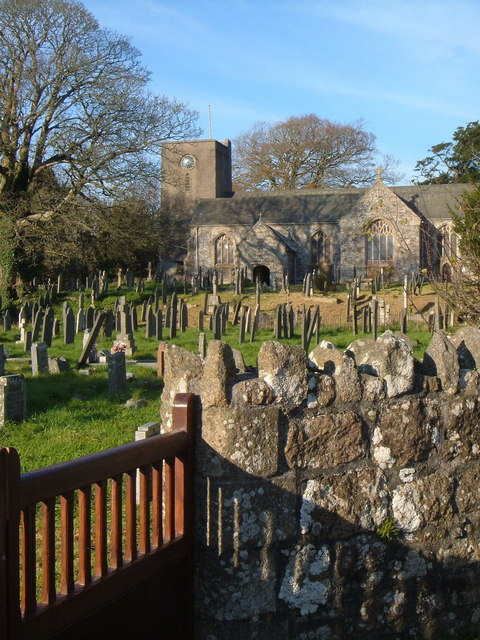
Saint Michael's Church

The Church of St Michael's is Cornwood's parish church.

It was from Cornwood vicarage, in 1785, that Reverend Thomas Vivian wrote Revelation explained, a pioneering attempt by the Established Church to write about the Book of Revelation for a general audience. Thomas Vivian believed his subject matter fell naturally into three sections; the first dealt with verifiable historical events, the second dealt with contemporary and continuing events that characterised a church that had departed from "the Simplicity of the Gospel" and, finally, prophecies for the future. The book was dedicated to the Bishop of Exeter, published in Plymouth and distributed from London, Bath and Exeter.
