= Hele's School =

Location
- Seymour Road; South West; Plympton, Plymouth, Devon, PL7 4LT; England; 50°23′33″N 4°03′56″W

Information
- Former name: Plympton Grammar School
- School type: Academy Converter
- Motto: A great place to learn. A great place to grow.
- Religious affiliation: N/A
- Established: 1658; 368 years ago
- Founder: From a bequest of Elize Hele
- Local authority: Plymouth
- Trust: Westcountry Schools Trust (WesT)
- Department for Education URN: 136557 Tables
- Ofsted: Reports
- Principal: Emma Clapham
- Staff: 188
- Years offered: Years 7 through 14
- Gender: Mixed
- Age range: 11-18
- Enrolment: 1,386
- Schedule: Tutor: 08:40 - 09:10; Period 1: 09:10 - 10:10; Period 2: 10:10 - 11:10; Break 1: 11:10 - 11:40; Period 3: 11:40 - 12:40; Period 4: 12:40 - 13:40; Break 2: 13:40 - 14:10; Period 5: 14:10 - 15:10
- Hours in school day: 5 hours, 30 minutes
- Colour: Selective Yellow
- Website: https://www.heles.plymouth.sch.uk/

Hele's School, formerly Plympton Grammar School, is a co-educational secondary school and sixth form located in Plympton, Plymouth, England. It is a comprehensive school for pupils aged 11 to 18 and is part of the Westcountry Schools Trust (WeST). The school has around 1,350 students on roll, including around 210 in the sixth form. Hele's School has an eight-form entry system, with a published admission number of 240 per year group.

The school offers a broad curriculum at Key Stages 3 and 4, with students ordinarily choosing GCSE options in Year 9. Post-16 education is delivered through a dedicated sixth form centre. Alongside academic provision, the school runs a Combined Cadet Force (CCF) with Army, Royal Navy, and Royal Air Force sections, as well as an established Duke of Edinburgh's Award scheme.

The current Acting Principal is Emma Clapham, since 1 September 2025.

== History ==
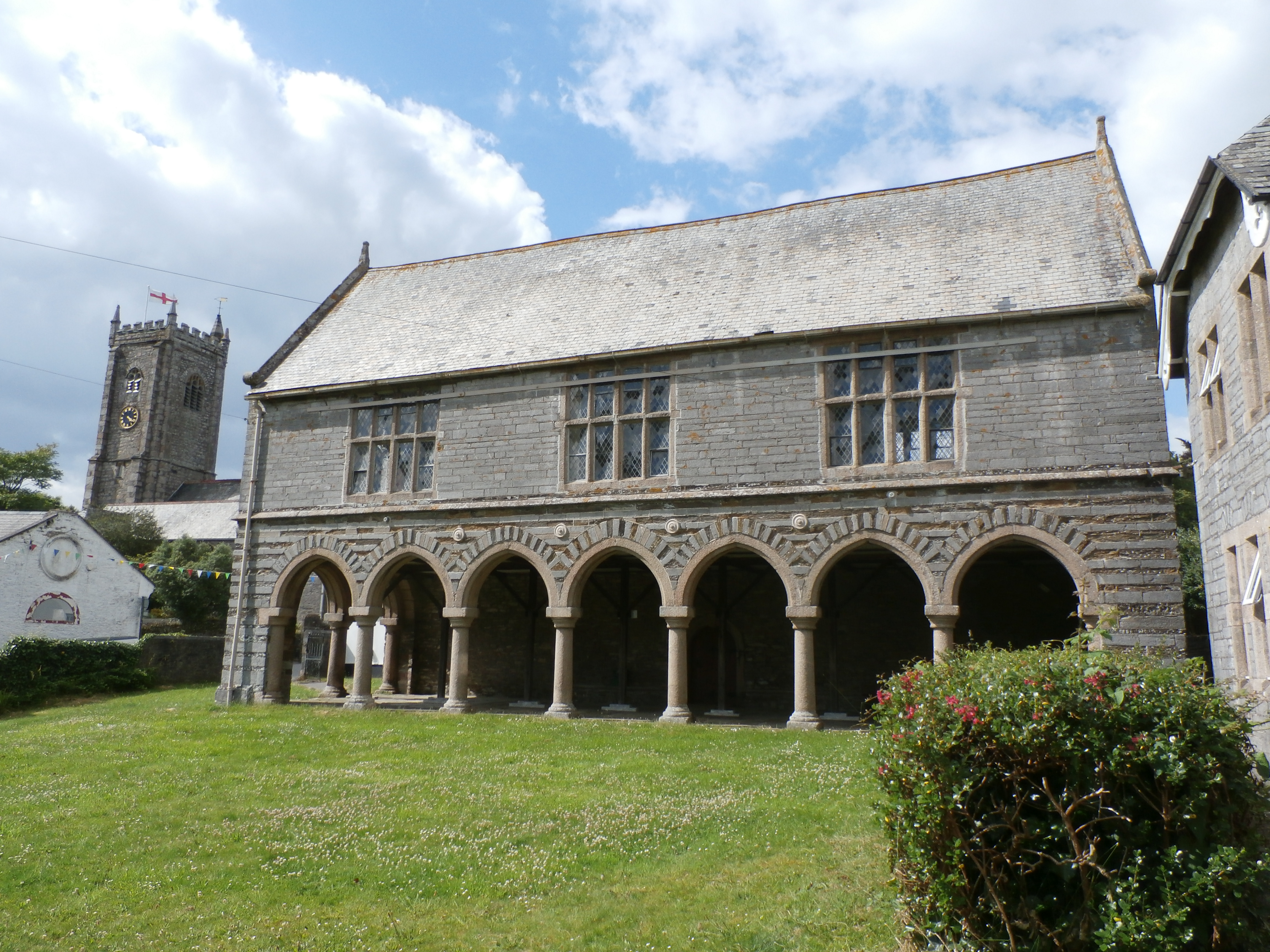
Old Grammar School, Plympton, founded 1658, built 1664, attended by Joshua Reynolds whose father was headmaster

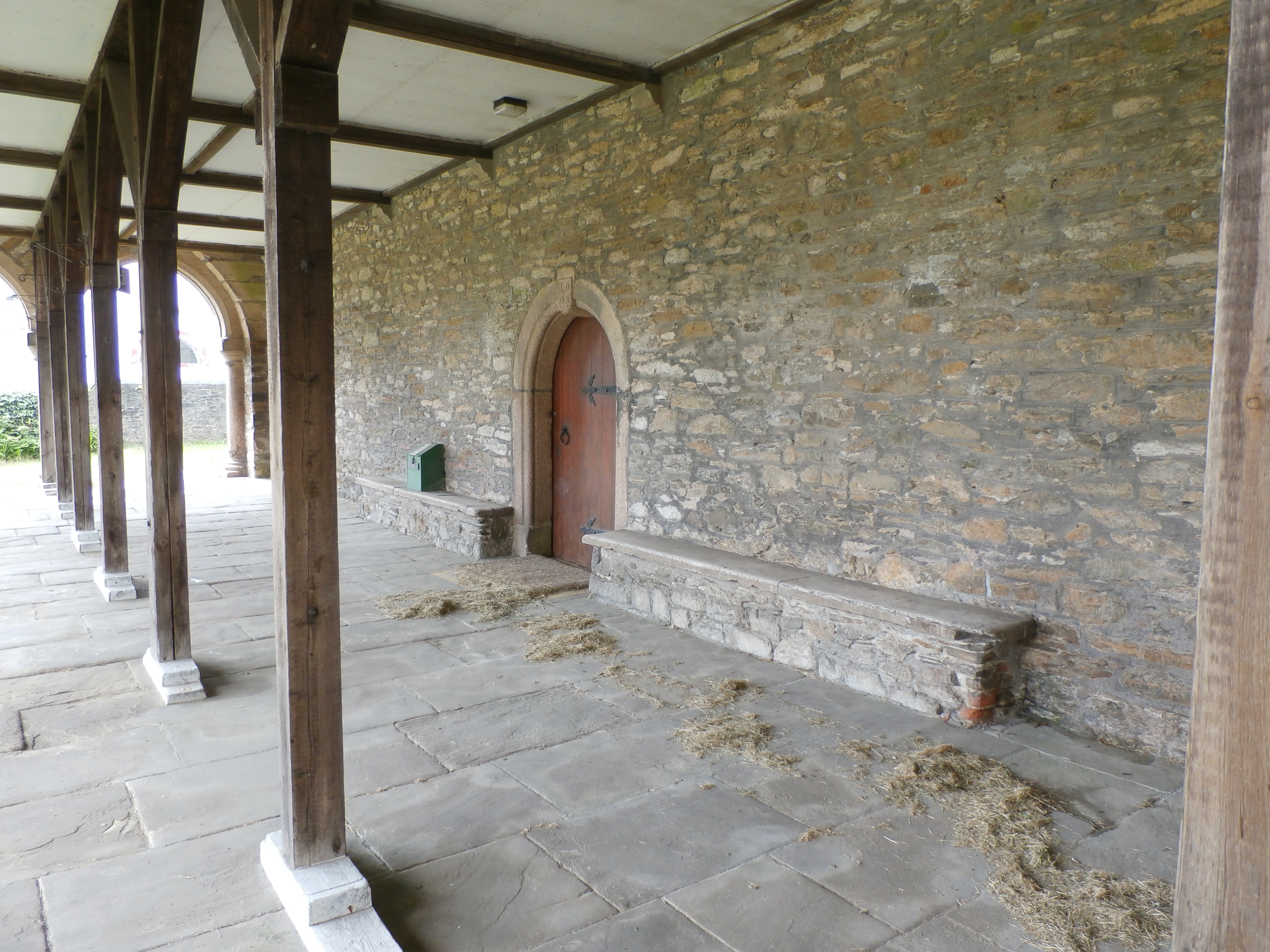
Under the colonnade of the Old Grammar School, Plympton, the school-room being above

Hele's School traces its origins to the legacy of Elize Hele (1560–1635), a lawyer and philanthropist from Brixton, Devon, who left his estate to fund charitable and educational purposes. His trustees established several schools in the South West, including a Grammar school in Plympton. The original Plympton Grammar School building, completed in 1671 in Plympton St Maurice, still stands today. It is a Grade II* listed building. Next to it was the schoolmaster's house, where the painter Sir Joshua Reynolds was born. The grammar school produced several notable artists, including Reynolds, James Northcote, Benjamin Haydon, and Sir Charles Eastlake.

The school closed in 1903 due to financial difficulties but was re-established in 1921 by Devon County Council as Plympton Grammar School. It moved to its current site on Seymour Road in 1937. In 1983, following a period of expansion and reorganisation, it became an 11-18 co-educational comprehensive school and was renamed Hele's School.

In the early 2000s, Hele's held specialist status in Languages, Mathematics and Computing, and Applied Learning, gaining recognition as a Language College. The school converted to academy status in April 2011, initially as a stand-alone academy trust - 'Hele's Trust' - before joining the Westcountry Schools Trust (WeST) in September 2017.

== Prime Minister's Global Fellowship ==
Students have attained places on the Prime Minister's Global Fellowship programme. The school achieved its first student in the inaugural year of the programme, 2008, and in 2009 had another successful applicant.

== Notable former pupils ==
=== Plympton Grammar School (1658–1983) ===
- Charles Eastlake, painter
- Benjamin Haydon, painter and writer
- Patricia Hollis, politician
- Anthony Nicholls (physicist), entrepreneur, based in USA
- James Northcote, painter
- John Parker, 1st Earl of Morley (1772-1840) of nearby Saltram House
- Charles Morice Pole, naval officer and politician
- Sir Joshua Reynolds, painter
- Samuel Rowe, topographer
- Parson John "Jack" Russell, clergyman, sportsman and dog breeder
- Sir Gordon Shattock, Conservative Party's Western-area Chairman, who survived the 1984 Brighton bombing
- Harry Trelawny, dissenting minister, Church of England clergyman, and Roman Catholic priest

=== Hele's School (1983–Present) ===
- Lewis Gregory, cricketer
- Kevin Foster, Conservative MP
