= South Hams District Council elections =

Local government elections in Devon, England

Political composition of the council by ward as of 2023

South Hams District Council is the local authority for the South Hams District in Devon, England. The council is elected every four years. Since the last boundary changes in 2015, 31 councillors have been elected from 20 wards: eleven of which elect one councillor, seven elect two councillors and two elect three councillors. Between 1999 and 2014, 40 councillors were elected from 30 wards.

== Election results ==
Composition of the council
Year	Conservative	Liberal Democrats (Note: Includes totals for the predecessors of the Liberal Democrats, the Liberal Party and SDP (both of which participated in the Alliance).)	Labour	Green (Note: Includes totals for the predecessors of the Green Party of England and Wales, the Ecology Party and Green Party UK.)	Independents & Others	Council control after election
Local government reorganisation; council established (41 seats)
1973	2	0	0	–	39	Independent
1976	7	2	0	0	32	Independent
New ward boundaries (44 seats)
1979	9	3	1	0	31	Independent
1983	27	4	0	0	13	Conservative
1987	27	3	1	0	13	Conservative
1991	23	4	1	0	16	Conservative
1995	17	10	2	0	15	No overall control
New ward boundaries (40 seats)
1999	29	4	3	0	4	Conservative
2003	28	7	3	0	2	Conservative
2007	28	9	0	0	3	Conservative
2011	30	5	1	3	1	Conservative
New ward boundaries (31 seats)
2015	25	2	1	3	0	Conservative
2019	16	10	0	3	2	Conservative
2023	7	19	1	3	1	Liberal Democrats

== District result maps ==
1999 results map

2003 results map

2007 results map

2011 results map

2015 results map

2019 results map

2023 results map

== By-election results ==
=== 1995-1999 ===
Avon & Harbourne By-Election 10 October 1996
Party	Candidate	Votes	%	±%
Conservative		348	57.6	
Liberal Democrats		256	42.4	
Majority		92	15.2	
Turnout		604		
Conservative gain from Liberal Democrats		Swing		

West Dart By-Election 13 March 1997
Party	Candidate	Votes	%	±%
Conservative		398	69.6	
Liberal Democrats		174	30.4	
Majority		224	39.2	
Turnout		572	43.6	
Conservative gain from Independent		Swing		

=== 1999-2003 ===
Dartmouth Townstal By-Election 1 November 2001
Party	Candidate	Votes	%	±%
Liberal Democrats		174	33.9	+20.0
Labour		130	25.3	−48.7
Independent		112	21.8	+21.8
Independent		76	14.8	+14.8
Independent		22	4.3	+4.3
Majority		44	8.6	
Turnout		514	30.7	
Liberal Democrats gain from Labour		Swing		

=== 2003-2007 ===
Ivy Bridge Woodlands By-Election 8 December 2005
Party	Candidate	Votes	%	±%
Conservative	Linda Facy	211	41.9	
Independent	Brian Scown	164	32.5	
Liberal Democrats	David Robinson	129	25.6	
Majority		47	16.3	
Turnout		504	15.4	
Conservative hold		Swing		

Erme Valley By-Election 2 March 2006
Party	Candidate	Votes	%	±%
Conservative	George Rosevear	643	52.7	−4.7
Liberal Democrats	Brian Blake	471	38.6	−4.0
Labour	David Trigger	106	8.7	+8.7
Majority		172	14.1	
Turnout		1,220		
Conservative hold		Swing		

=== 2007-2011 ===
Totnes Bridgetown By-Election 12 November 2009
Party	Candidate	Votes	%	±%
Liberal Democrats	Mike Hannaford	522	52.4	+27.4
Green	Jacqi Hodgson	265	26.6	+26.6
Conservative	Bob Greig	162	16.2	+5.5
Labour	Chris Robillard	48	4.8	−4.1
Majority		257	25.8	
Turnout		997	33.9	
Liberal Democrats hold		Swing		

Ivybridge Filham By-Election 18 February 2010
Party	Candidate	Votes	%	±%
Liberal Democrats	Tony Barber	379	44.3	+11.9
Conservative	Alan Wright	356	41.6	−26.0
Labour	Helen Eassom	121	14.1	+14.1
Majority		23	2.7	
Turnout		856	21.8	
Liberal Democrats gain from Conservative		Swing		

=== 2015-2019 ===
This by-election was called following the resignation of Green Party councillor Barrie Wood.

Totnes By-Election 8 October 2015
Party	Candidate	Votes	%	±%
Green	John Green	570	30.1	
Liberal Democrats	John Birch	558	29.5	
Labour	Eleanor Cohen	432	22.8	
Conservative	Ralph Clark	268	14.2	
Independent	Peter Pirnie	63	3.3	
Majority		12	0.6	
Turnout		1891	28.37	
Green hold		Swing		

This by-election was called following the resignation of Conservative councillor Lindsay Ward

Charterlands By-Election 23 February 2017
Party	Candidate	Votes	%	±%
Liberal Democrats	Elizabeth Huntley	473	46.1	+46.1
Conservative	Jonathan Bell	404	39.3	−25.0
Labour	David Trigger	110	10.7	10.7
Green	Janet Champman	40	3.9	−15.6
Majority		69	0.6	
Turnout		1027		
Liberal Democrats gain from Conservative		Swing		

=== 2019-2023 ===
This by-election was called following the death of Conservative councillor David May.

Ivybridge West By-Election 6 May 2021
Party	Candidate	Votes	%	±%
Conservative	Louise Jones	933	50.4	+7.7
Green	Katie Reville	768	41.5	+41.5
TUSC	Tony Rea	149	8.1	+8.1
Majority		165	0.6	
Turnout		1,850	8.9	
Conservative hold		Swing		
