= 2019 South Hams District Council election =

2019 UK local government election

← 2015	2 May 2019	2023 →

All 31 seats in the South Hams District Council 16 seats needed for a majority
	First party	Second party
Party	Conservative	Liberal Democrats
Last election	25	2
Seats won	16	10
Seat change	▼9	▲8
	Third party	Fourth party
Party	Green	Independent
Last election	3	0
Seats won	3	2
Seat change	Steady	▲2
- Map showing the results of the 2019 South Hams District Council elections.
Council control before election
Conservative
Council control after election
Conservative

Elections to the South Hams District Council took place on 2 May 2019, the same day as other United Kingdom local elections. All 20 wards were up for election, each with either 1, 2, or 3 councillors to be elected. The Conservative Party retained overall control of the council, but with its majority reduced to just 1 seat.

== Summary ==
=== Election result ===
2019 South Hams District Council election
Party	Candidates	Seats	Gains	Losses	Net gain/loss	Seats %	Votes %	Votes	+/−
Conservative	29	16	0	9	▼9	51.6	38.1	17,546	–15.1
Liberal Democrats	22	10	8	0	▲8	32.3	30.6	14,085	+20.6
Green	9	3	0	0	Steady	9.7	12.3	5,646	–7.0
Independent	4	2	2	0	▲2	6.5	5.1	2,329	+2.3
Labour	22	0	0	1	▼1	0.0	13.9	6,387	+1.5

== Ward elections ==
=== Allington & Strete ===
2019 South Hams District Council elections: Allington & Strete Ward
Party	Candidate	Votes	%
Conservative	Richard John Foss	443	42.8
Liberal Democrats	Laurel Maria Jasmine Lawford	395	38.2
Green	Suzanne Ellis	155	15.0
Labour	Peter Ernest McIlven	42	4.1
Rejected ballots			
Turnout		1,043	44.12%
Conservative hold			

=== Bickleigh & Cornwood ===
2019 South Hams District Council elections: Bickleigh & Cornwood Ward
Party	Candidate	Votes	%
Conservative	Barrie Michael Spencer	515	76.1
Labour	Michael Arthur Vincent Cade	162	23.9
Rejected ballots		33	
Turnout		710	31.67%
Conservative hold			

=== Blackawton & Stoke Fleming Ward ===
2019 South Hams District Council elections: Blackawton & Stoke Fleming Ward
Party	Candidate	Votes	%
Conservative	Helen Emily May Reeve	402	47.4
Liberal Democrats	Simon John Rake	391	46.1
Labour	David John Matthews	55	6.5
Rejected ballots		9	
Turnout		857	44.99%
Conservative hold			

=== Charterlands ===
2019 South Hams District Council elections: Charterlands Ward
Party	Candidate	Votes	%
Conservative	Bernard James Taylor	537	52.3
Liberal Democrats	George Henry William Rosevear	332	32.4
Labour	David James Trigger	157	15.3
Rejected ballots		21	
Turnout		1,047	44.92%
Conservative hold			

=== Dartington & Staverton ===
2019 South Hams District Council elections: Dartington & Staverton Ward
Party	Candidate	Votes	%
Green	Jacqueline Mary Hodgson	853	81.5
Conservative	Jennifer Louise McGeever	193	18.5
Rejected ballots		10	
Turnout		1,056	48.2%
Green hold			

=== Dartmouth & East Dart (3) ===
2019 South Hams District Council elections: Dartmouth & East Dart Ward
Party	Candidate	Votes	%
Conservative	Jonathan Denis Hawkins	1,383	50.9
Conservative	Hilary Douglas Bastone	1,317	48.4
Conservative	Rosemary Rowe	965	35.5
Liberal Democrats	Richard Mark Horsley Heseltine	865	31.8
Labour	Nathan Luke Bodinnar	779	28.7
Labour	Graham Reid Campbell	614	22.6
Independent	John Edward Renwick Robinson	475	17.5
Rejected ballots		58	
Turnout		2,777	44.9%
Conservative hold			
Conservative hold			
Conservative hold			

=== Ermington & Ugborough ===
2019 South Hams District Council elections: Ermington & Ugborough Ward
Party	Candidate	Votes	%
Conservative	Thomas Richard Holway	491	58.9
Labour	Louise Rea	182	21.8
Liberal Democrats	Anthony David Power	161	19.3
Rejected ballots		28	
Turnout		862	38.95%
Conservative hold			

=== Ivybridge East (2) ===
2019 South Hams District Council elections: Ivybridge East Ward
Party	Candidate	Votes	%
Liberal Democrats	Victor James Abbott	574	45.3
Conservative	Karen Ann Pringle	565	44.6
Conservative	Richard Alistair Martyn Peachey	483	38.2
Labour	Tessa Soma Lannin	468	37.0
Rejected ballots		28	
Turnout		1,294	30.33%
Liberal Democrats gain from Conservative			
Conservative hold			

=== Ivybridge West (2) ===
2019 South Hams District Council elections: Ivybridge West Ward
Party	Candidate	Votes	%
Conservative	David William May*	703	52.5
Conservative	Lance Peter Austen	662	49.5
Labour	Anthony Thomas Rea	520	38.9
Liberal Democrats	David Allan Robinson	424	31.7
Rejected ballots		66	
Turnout		1,404	29.6%
Conservative hold			
Conservative hold			

- Cllr. David William May died in December 2020, a by-election will be held in May 2021.

=== Kingsbridge ===
2019 South Hams District Council elections: Kingsbridge Ward
Party	Candidate	Votes	%
Liberal Democrats	Denise Maria O'Callaghan	809	49.3
Liberal Democrats	Susan Jackson	737	44.9
Conservative	Keith Robert Henry Wingate	560	34.1
Conservative	Samantha Dennis	539	32.8
Labour	Gerrie Lee Messer	327	19.9
Rejected ballots		46	
Turnout		1648	36.9%
Liberal Democrats gain from Conservative			
Liberal Democrats gain from Conservative			

=== Loddiswell & Aveton Gifford ===
2019 South Hams District Council elections: Loddiswell & Aveton Gifford Ward
Party	Candidate	Votes	%
Liberal Democrats	Katharine Georgina Kemp	362	47.0
Conservative	Ian Bramble	305	39.6
Labour	John Harvey	104	13.5
Rejected ballots		24	
Turnout		795	36.5%
Liberal Democrats gain from Conservative			

=== Marldon & Littlehempston ===
2019 South Hams District Council elections: Marldon & Littlehempston Ward
Party	Candidate	Votes	%
Independent	James Trevor Pennington	380	42.4
Conservative	Stephen Maurice Veasey	205	22.9
Green	Margaret Gillian Coombs	126	14.0
Liberal Democrats	Keith Anthony Smith	126	14.0
Labour	Evelyn Ruth Burges	60	6.7
Rejected ballots		6	
Turnout		903	38.67%
Independent gain from Conservative			

=== Newton & Yealmpton ===
2019 South Hams District Council elections: Newton & Yealmpton Ward
Party	Candidate	Votes	%
Liberal Democrats	Keith John Baldry	1,236	62.6
Liberal Democrats	Daniel James Thomas	1,141	57.8
Conservative	Basil Fernley Cane	614	31.1
Conservative	Michael David Blake	509	25.8
Labour	Edward Denis Parsons	155	7.9
Rejected ballots		34	
Turnout		2,007	41.41%
Liberal Democrats hold			
Liberal Democrats gain from Conservative			

=== Salcombe and Thurlestone ===
2019 South Hams District Council elections: Salcombe and Thurlestone Ward
Party	Candidate	Votes	%
Independent	Mark Leonard Christopher Long	1,191	61.2
Conservative	Judith Anne Pearce	739	38.0
Conservative	Simon Anthony Edward Wright	706	36.3
Liberal Democrats	Alan Christopher Kerr	336	17.3
Labour	Helen Anne Beetham	159	8.2
Rejected ballots		9	
Turnout		1,956	48.78%
Independent gain from Conservative			
Conservative hold			

=== South Brent (2) ===
2019 South Hams District Council elections: South Brent Ward
Party	Candidate	Votes	%
Conservative	Peter Courtenay Smerdon	744	36.1
Liberal Democrats	Guy Alexander Pannell	729	35.4
Conservative	Robert Cyril Steer	715	34.7
Liberal Democrats	Charlotte Victoria Power	663	32.2
Green	Gavin Shaun Fennell	417	20.2
Green	Colin Raymond Moore	371	18.0
Labour	Lynn Alderson	203	9.8
Labour	Paul David Bishop	169	8.2
Rejected ballots		23	
Turnout		2,085	49.96%
Conservative hold			
Liberal Democrats gain from Conservative			

=== Stokenham ===
2019 South Hams District Council elections: Stokenham Ward
Party	Candidate	Votes	%
Liberal Democrats	Julian Brazil	690	67.4
Conservative	Joshua John Alexander Gardiner	298	29.1
Labour	Richard Michael Gaehl	35	3.4
Rejected ballots		11	
Turnout		1,034	47.47%
Liberal Democrats hold			

=== Totnes (3) ===
2019 South Hams District Council elections: Totnes Ward
Party	Candidate	Votes	%
Liberal Democrats	John Percy Birch	1,424	44.9
Green	Joanna Marie Sweett	1,350	42.5
Green	Joseph Deal Rose	1,062	33.5
Liberal Democrats	Emily Harriet Price	924	29.1
Liberal Democrats	John Malcolm Anderson	899	28.3
Green	Christopher Maguire	892	28.1
Labour	Laurel Ellis	654	20.6
Labour	Louise Michelle Webberley	630	19.9
Labour	Colin Stuart Luker	601	18.9
Conservative	Philip Charles Paine	376	11.8
Rejected ballots		17	
Turnout		3,190	46.32%
Liberal Democrats gain from Labour			
Green hold			
Green hold			

=== Wembury and Brixton (2) ===
2019 South Hams District Council elections: Wembury and Brixton Ward
Party	Candidate	Votes	%
Conservative	Daniel James Brown	825	53.4
Conservative	Matthew John Chown	753	48.7
Green	Katy Ward-Edwards	420	27.2
Independent	Ian Stuart Martin	283	18.3
Liberal Democrats	Brian Samuel Blake	265	17.2
Labour	Alastair William Henderson	202	13.1
Rejected ballots			22
Turnout		1,567	40.22%
Conservative hold			
Conservative hold			

=== West Dart ===
2019 South Hams District Council elections: West Dart Ward
Party	Candidate	Votes	%
Liberal Democrats	John Peter McKay	602	64.2
Conservative	Leigh Ann Munro	336	35.8
Rejected ballots		14	
Turnout		952	46.2%
Liberal Democrats gain from Conservative			

=== Woolwell ===
2019 South Hams District Council elections: Woolwell Ward
Party	Candidate	Votes	%
Conservative	Nicola Ann Hopwood	663	85.9
Labour	Paul Francis Furlong	109	14.1
Rejected ballots		18	
Turnout		790	34.8%
Conservative hold			

== Changes 2019–2023 ==
Jo Sweett, elected for the Greens in Totnes ward, left the party to sit as an independent councillor in February 2021.

=== Ivybridge West ===
Ivybridge West by-election 6 May 2021
Party	Candidate	Votes	%	±%
Conservative	Louise Jones	933	50.4	−2.1
Green	Katie Reville	768	41.5	N/A
TUSC	Tony Rea	149	8.1	−30.8
Majority		165	8.9	
Turnout		1,850		
Conservative hold		Swing	▼16.9	
