= 2011 South Hams District Council election =

2011 UK local government election

← 2007	5 May 2011	2015 →

All 40 seats in the South Hams District Council 21 seats needed for a majority
- Turnout: 51.8%
	First party	Second party	Third party
Party	Conservative	Liberal Democrats	Green
Seats won	30	5	3
Seat change	▲3	▼4	▲2
Popular vote	24,091	8,804	4,567
Percentage	53.2%	20.5%	10.6%
	Fourth party	Fifth party
Party	Independent	Labour
Seats won	1	1
Seat change	▼2	▲1
Popular vote	3,216	1,757
Percentage	7.5%	4.1%
- Map showing the results of the 2011 South Hams District Council elections.
Council control before election
Conservative
Council control after election
Conservative

Elections to South Hams District Council took place on 5 May 2011, the same day as other United Kingdom local elections and the Alternative Vote referendum. 27 of the 30 wards were up for election, each with either 1,2 or 3 councillors to be elected. The number of seats up for election in each ward is indicated by the number in the brackets following the ward name. 37 of the 40 councillors elected in 2007 defend their seats in this year. The three wards of Ivybridge Central, Newton & Noss and Thurlestone were uncontested, only having one candidate each, so no election took place. The candidates were Michael Francis Saltern, Suzie Cooper and Ian Bramble respectively; all of whom were from the Conservative Party.

== Results summary ==
South Hams District Council election, 2011
Party	Seats	Gains	Losses	Net gain/loss	Seats %	Votes %	Votes	+/−
Conservative	30	4	1	+3	75.0	56.0	24,091	
Liberal Democrats	5	0	4	-4	12.5	20.5	8,804	
Green	3	2	0	+2	7.5	10.6	4,567	
Independent	1	0	2	-2	2.5	7.5	3,216	
Labour	1	1	0	+1	2.5	4.1	1,757	
UKIP	0	0	0	0	0.0	1.3	574	

== Ward elections ==
=== Allington and Loddiswell ===
South Hams District Council elections: Allington and Loddiswell ward, 2011
Party	Candidate	Votes	%	±%
Conservative	Michael Hicks	630	68.9%	
Green	Sandy Matthews	152	16.6%	
Liberal Democrats	Sam English	132	14.4%	
Rejected ballots		16	1.7%	
Turnout		930	51.2%	
Conservative hold		Swing		

=== Avon and Harbourne ===
South Hams District Council elections: Avon and Harbourne ward, 2011
Party	Candidate	Votes	%	±%
Conservative	Robert Steer	646	67.6%	
Green	Christopher Kingdon Noakes	310	32.4%	
Rejected ballots		12	1.2%	
Turnout		968	52.7%	
Conservative hold		Swing		

=== Bickleigh & Shaugh (2) ===
South Hams District Council elections: Bickleigh & Shaugh ward, 2011
Party	Candidate	Votes	%	±%
Conservative	Bill Hitchins	774	28.7%	
Conservative	Carolyn Bruce-Spencer	686	25.4%	
Independent	Roger Brown Whittle	479	17.8%	
Independent	Elaine Kill Smerdon	366	13.6%	
Liberal Democrats	Amanda-Jayne Morton	212	7.9%	
Liberal Democrats	Christopher Neill Morton	178	6.6%	
Rejected ballots		12	0.8%	
Turnout		1568	41.8%	
Conservative hold		Swing		

=== Charterlands ===
South Hams District Council elections: Charterlands ward (Kingston and Bigbury), 2011
Party	Candidate	Votes	%	±%
Conservative	Bryan Edward Carson	673	64.4%	
Liberal Democrats	Andrew Bridgwater	266	25.5%	
UKIP	Colin David Curtis	106	10.1%	
Rejected ballots		14	1.3%	
Turnout		1,059	61.7%	
Conservative hold		Swing		

=== Cornwood and Sparkwell ===
South Hams District Council elections: Cornwood and Sparkwell ward, 2011
Party	Candidate	Votes	%	±%
Conservative	Ian Blackler	431	45.2%	
Independent	Sally Margaret Fairman	363	38.1%	
Green	Peter James Lanyon	99	10.4%	
Liberal Democrats	Sally Jenkins	61	6.4%	
Rejected ballots		7	0.7%	
Turnout		961	50.4%	
Conservative hold		Swing		

=== Dartington ===
South Hams District Council elections: Dartington ward, 2011
Party	Candidate	Votes	%	±%
Green	Jacqi Hodgson	404	51.2%	
Conservative	Ruksaana Schutt	247	31.3%	
Liberal Democrats	Guy Alexander Pannell	138	17.5%	
Rejected ballots		10	1.3%	
Turnout		800	54.0%	
Green gain from Conservative		Swing		

=== Dartmouth (Townstal) ===
South Hams District Council elections: Dartmouth (Townstal) ward, 2011
Party	Candidate	Votes	%	±%
Labour Co-op	Benjamin Stuart Cooper	244	39.7%	
Liberal Democrats	Stephen Smith	210	34.2%	
Independent	Francis John Hawke	160	26.1%	
Rejected ballots		6	0.9%	
Turnout		675	37.9%	
Labour gain from Independent		Swing		

=== Dartmouth and Kingswear (3) ===
South Hams District Council elections: Dartmouth and Kingswear ward, 2011
Party	Candidate	Votes	%	±%
Conservative	Jonathan Hawkins	1,446	33.1%	
Conservative	Hilary Bastone	1,195	29.4%	
Conservative	Melvyn Stone	1,029	25.3%	
Liberal Democrats	Denise O'Callaghan	499	12.3%	
Rejected ballots		51	2.7%	
Turnout		1,918	50.9%	
Conservative hold		Swing		

=== East Dart ===
South Hams District Council elections: East Dart ward, 2011
Party	Candidate	Votes	%	±%
Conservative	Rosemary Rowe	526	56.9%	
Liberal Democrats	Keith Anthony Smith	398	43.1%	
Rejected ballots		26	2.7%	
Turnout		950	59.9%	
Conservative hold		Swing		

=== Eastmoor ===
South Hams District Council elections: Eastmoor ward (rural Buckfastleigh), 2011
Party	Candidate	Votes	%	±%
Conservative	Peter Smerdon	507	45.0%	
Liberal Democrats	Colin Watson Jones	314	27.9%	
Green	Lydia Helen Somerville	205	18.2%	
Independent	John Dance	93	8.3%	
Rejected ballots		7	0.6%	
Turnout		1,126	60.6%	
Conservative gain from Liberal Democrats		Swing		

=== Erme Valley (2) ===
South Hams District Council elections: Erme Valley ward, 2011
Party	Candidate	Votes	%	±%
Conservative	Tom Holway	1,258	31.9%	
Conservative	Lindsay Ward	1,070	29.4%	
Liberal Democrats	Sandi Marshall	512	14.1%	
Liberal Democrats	Mary Talbot-Rosevear	459	12.6%	
Independent	George Rosevear	436	12.0%	
Rejected ballots		28	1.3%	
Turnout		2,103	52.1%	
Conservative hold		Swing		
Conservative gain from Liberal Democrats		Swing		

=== Ivybridge Filham (2) ===
South Hams District Council elections: Ivybridge Filham ward, 2011
Party	Candidate	Votes	%	±%
Conservative	Kathy Cuthbert	841	30.6%	
Liberal Democrats	Tony Barber	576	21.0%	
Conservative	Richard Alistair Martyn Peachey	559	20.4%	
Labour	Chris Childs	357	13.0%	
Green	Daniel Forster	257	9.4%	
Green	Paula Black	156	5.7%	
Rejected ballots		19	1.2%	
Turnout		1,643	41.8%	
Conservative hold		Swing		
Liberal Democrats hold		Swing		

=== Ivybridge Woodlands (2) ===
South Hams District Council elections: Ivybridge Woodlands ward, 2011
Party	Candidate	Votes	%	±%
Conservative	David William May	818	33.0%	
Conservative	Louise Paula Jones	713	28.8%	
Labour Co-op	Helen Eassom	355	14.3%	
Green	Katie Anne Reville	282	11.4%	
Liberal Democrats	Jon May	219	8.8%	
Green	Stephen John Casemore	89	3.6%	
Rejected ballots		9	0.6%	
Turnout		1,453	42.4%	
Conservative hold		Swing		

=== Kingsbridge East ===
South Hams District Council elections: Kingsbridge East ward, 2011
Party	Candidate	Votes	%	±%
Conservative	Keith Wingate	603	76.6%	
Liberal Democrats	Mo Hort	184	23.4%	
Rejected ballots		38	4.6%	
Turnout		828	48.6%	
Conservative hold		Swing		

=== Kingsbridge North ===
South Hams District Council elections: Kingsbridge North ward, 2011
Party	Candidate	Votes	%	±%
Conservative	Rufus Gilbert	547	72.7%	
Liberal Democrats	Andrew Hort	205	27.3%	
Rejected ballots		11	1.4%	
Turnout		763	41.8%	
Conservative hold		Swing		

=== Marldon ===
South Hams District Council elections: Marldon ward, 2011
Party	Candidate	Votes	%	±%
Conservative	Trevor Pennington	756	78.3%	
Independent	Ray Harrington	160	16.6%	
Liberal Democrats	Davis Allan Robinson	49	5.1%	
Rejected ballots		5	0.5%	
Turnout		970	53.5%	
Conservative hold		Swing		

=== Salcombe and Malborough (2) ===
South Hams District Council elections: Salcombe and Malborough ward, 2011
Party	Candidate	Votes	%	±%
Conservative	Paul Coulson	964	42.8%	
Conservative	John Carter	945	41.9%	
Liberal Democrats	Lorna Brazil	344	15.3%	
Rejected ballots		12	0.8%	
Turnout		1,421	50.8%	
Conservative hold		Swing		

=== Saltstone ===
South Hams District Council elections: Saltstone ward (east of Kingsbridge Estuary), 2011
Party	Candidate	Votes	%	±%
Liberal Democrats	Julian Brazil	580	71.9%	
Conservative	Sandy Gilbert	227	28.1%	
Rejected ballots		7	0.9%	
Turnout		814	61.8%	
Liberal Democrats hold		Swing		

=== Skerries ===
South Hams District Council elections: Skerries ward (Slapton-Stoke Fleming), 2011
Party	Candidate	Votes	%	±%
Conservative	Richard Foss	702	75.1%	
Liberal Democrats	Justine Chinn	233	24.9%	
Rejected ballots		24	2.5%	
Turnout		959	56.5%	
Conservative hold		Swing		

=== South Brent ===
South Hams District Council elections: South Brent ward, 2011
Party	Candidate	Votes	%	±%
Liberal Democrats	Catherine Madeleine Pannell	515	45.9%	
Conservative	Richard Hosking	391	34.8%	
Green	Shruti Gordon	217	19.3%	
Rejected ballots		9	0.8%	
Turnout		1,132	53.6%	
Liberal Democrats hold		Swing		

=== Stokenham ===
South Hams District Council elections: Stokenham ward, 2011
Party	Candidate	Votes	%	±%
Conservative	John Baverstock	739	78.6%	
Liberal Democrats	Claire Beagley	201	21.4%	
Rejected ballots		12	1.3%	
Turnout		952	58.0%	
Conservative hold		Swing		

=== Totnes Bridgetown (2) ===
South Hams District Council elections: Totnes Bridgetown ward, 2011
Party	Candidate	Votes	%	±%
Independent	Judy Westacott	895	37.6%	
Liberal Democrats	Mike Hannaford	603	25.3%	
Green	Susie Greenway	332	14.0%	
Green	Roselle Loweneth Angwin	241	10.1%	
Labour	Eleanor Cohen	173	7.3%	
Labour	Louise Jane Lewis	135	5.7%	
Rejected ballots		17	1.2%	
Turnout		1,451	50.2%	
Independent hold		Swing		
Liberal Democrats hold		Swing		

=== Totnes Town (2) ===
South Hams District Council elections: Totnes Town ward, 2011
Party	Candidate	Votes	%	±%
Green	Robert Vint	674	20.0%	
Green	Alan Gorman	639	19.0%	
Liberal Democrats	Anne Patricia Ward	636	18.9%	
Labour	Tony Whitty	493	14.7%	
Conservative	Richard O'Connell	473	14.1%	
Independent	John Thomas Dixon Macadie	264	7.9%	
Liberal Democrats	Robert James Stephenson	183	5.4%	
Rejected ballots		31	1.6%	
Turnout		1,936	51.8%	
Green hold		Swing		
Green gain from Liberal Democrats		Swing		

=== Wembury and Brixton (2) ===
South Hams District Council elections: Wembury and Brixton ward, 2011
Party	Candidate	Votes	%	±%
Conservative	John William Squire	1,241	43.5%	
Conservative	Basil Fernley Cane	1,146	40.1%	
UKIP	Terence John Clarke	468	16.4%	
Rejected ballots		107	5.6%	
Turnout		1,913	50.8%	
Conservative hold		Swing		

=== West Dart ===
South Hams District Council elections: West Dart ward, 2011
Party	Candidate	Votes	%	±%
Conservative	John Tucker	613	61.9%	
Green	Mike North	226	22.8%	
Liberal Democrats	Richard Heseltine	151	15.3%	
Rejected ballots		7	0.7%	
Turnout		997	60.4%	
Conservative hold		Swing		

=== Westville and Alvington ===
South Hams District Council elections: Westville and Alvington ward, 2011
Party	Candidate	Votes	%	±%
Conservative	Simon Wright	382	49.9%	
Liberal Democrats	Laurel Lawford	300	39.2%	
Green	Thalia Vitali	83	10.8%	
Rejected ballots		9	1.2%	
Turnout		774	46.2%	
Conservative gain from Liberal Democrats		Swing		

=== Yealmpton ===
South Hams District Council elections: Yealmpton ward, 2011
Party	Candidate	Votes	%	±%
Liberal Democrats	Keith John Baldry	647	67.4%	
Conservative	Douglas Elliot Webster	313	32.6%	
Rejected ballots		19	1.9%	
Turnout		979	56.9%	
Liberal Democrats hold		Swing		
