= 2015 South Hams District Council election =

2015 UK local government election

← 2011	7 May 2015	2019 →

All 31 seats in the South Hams District Council 16 seats needed for a majority
	First party	Second party
Party	Conservative	Green
Seats won	25	3
Seat change	▼5	0
Popular vote	37,500	13,634
Percentage	53.2%	19.3%
Swing	▼2.8%	▲8.7%
	Third party	Fourth party
Party	Liberal Democrats	Labour
Seats won	2	1
Seat change	▼3	0
Popular vote	7,044	8,755
Percentage	10.0%	12.4%
Swing	▼10.5%	▲8.3%
- Map showing the results of the 2015 South Hams District Council elections.
Council control before election
Conservative
Council control after election
Conservative

Elections to South Hams District Council took place on 7 May, the same day as other United Kingdom local elections and the General Election. 19 of the 20 wards were up for election, each with either 1, 2 or 3 councillors to be elected. The number of seats up for election in each ward is indicated by the number in the brackets following the ward name. This was the first election with new boundary changes taking effect after the number of wards was reduced by ten and councillors by 9. The ward of Salcombe & Thurlestone was uncontested, with Conservative Party candidates Judy Pearce and Simon Wright elected. The Conservative Party increased their share of seats in the council, despite a slight decrease in votes. Meanwhile, the Green Party overtook the Liberal Democrats to become the largest opposition party.

== Results summary ==
South Hams District Council election, 2015
Party	Seats	Gains	Losses	Net gain/loss	Seats %	Votes %	Votes	+/−
Conservative	25	0	0	-5	80.6	53.2	37,500	-2.8
Green	3	0	0	0	9.7	19.3	13,634	+8.7
Liberal Democrats	2	0	0	-3	6.5	10.0	7,044	-10.5
Labour	1	0	0	0	3.2	12.4	8,755	+8.3
Independent	0	0	0	-1	0.0	2.8	1,952	-4.7
UKIP	0	0	0	0	0.0	1.9	1,312	+0.6
TUSC	0	0	0	0	0.0	0.5	349	+0.5

== Ward elections ==
=== Allington & Strete ===
South Hams District Council elections: Allington & Strete Ward, 2015
Party	Candidate	Votes	%	±%
Conservative	Richard John Foss	1,280	71.2%	
Green	Suzanne Ellis	519	28.8%	
Rejected ballots		32	1.7%	
Turnout		1831	75.4%	
Conservative win (new seat)				

=== Bickleigh & Cornwood ===
South Hams District Council elections: Bickleigh & Cornwood Ward, 2015
Party	Candidate	Votes	%	±%
Conservative	Robert Steer	1106	68.1%	
Green	Paul Sampson	328	20.2%	
Liberal Democrats	Mary Talbot-Rosevear	190	11.7%	
Rejected ballots		20	1.2%	
Turnout		1644	71.4%	
Conservative win (new seat)				

=== Blackawton & Stoke Fleming Ward ===
South Hams District Council elections: Blackawton & Stoke Fleming Ward, 2015
Party	Candidate	Votes	%	±%
Conservative	Michael Hicks	910	63.6%	
Green	Patrick Hadow	521	36.4%	
Rejected ballots		20	1.4%	
Turnout		1452	75.9%	
Conservative win (new seat)				

=== Charterlands ===
South Hams District Council elections: Charterlands Ward (Modbury), 2015
Party	Candidate	Votes	%	±%
Conservative	Lindsay Ward	1092	64.4%	
Green	Jan Chapman	330	19.5%	
Independent	William Rosevear	274	16.2%	
Rejected ballots		19	1.1%	
Turnout		1715	73.4%	
Conservative win (new seat)				

=== Dartington & Staverton ===
South Hams District Council elections: Dartington & Staverton Ward, 2015
Party	Candidate	Votes	%	±%
Green	Jacqi Hodgson	912	55.8%	
Conservative	Dave Roddy	500	30.6%	
Labour	Joanne Tisdall	221	13.5%	
Rejected ballots		16	1.0%	
Turnout		1649	76.8%	
Green win (new seat)				

=== Dartmouth & East Dart (3) ===
South Hams District Council elections: Dartmouth & East Dart Ward, 2015
Party	Candidate	Votes	%	±%
Conservative	Jonathan Hawkins	2,204	50.3%	
Conservative	Hilary Bastone	2,108	48.1%	
Conservative	Rose Rowe	1,791	40.9%	
Labour	Benjamin Cooper	1,028	23.5%	
Independent	Paul Allen	889	20.3%	
Labour	Colin Chapman	799	18.2%	
Labour	David Jones	671	15.3%	
Rejected ballots		107	2.4%	
Turnout		4,489	67.7%	
Conservative win (new seat)				
Conservative win (new seat)				
Conservative win (new seat)				

=== Ermington & Ugborough ===
South Hams District Council elections: Ermington & Ugborough Ward, 2015
Party	Candidate	Votes	%	±%
Conservative	Tom Holway	998	60.3%	
Green	Julie Deacon	384	23.2%	
Liberal Democrats	Samuel Blake	274	16.5%	
Rejected ballots		21	1.3%	
Turnout		1,677	72.4%	
Conservative win (new seat)				

=== Ivybridge East (2) ===
South Hams District Council elections: Ivybridge East Ward, 2015
Party	Candidate	Votes	%	±%
Conservative	Kathy Cuthbert	1,337	45.0%	
Conservative	Ann Pringle	1,247	42.0%	
Liberal Democrats	Tony Barber	991	33.4%	
Green	Kate Smallwood	686	23.1%	
UKIP	Eric Robbins	619	20.8%	
Rejected ballots		24	0.8%	
Turnout		2,994	66.8%	
Conservative win (new seat)				
Conservative win (new seat)				

=== Ivybridge West (2) ===
South Hams District Council elections: Ivybridge West Ward, 2015
Party	Candidate	Votes	%	±%
Conservative	David May	1,827	57.9%	
Conservative	Michael Saltern	1,583	50.2%	
Green	Katie Reville	1,296	41.1%	
Rejected ballots		42	1.3%	
Turnout		3,197	65.6%	
Conservative win (new seat)				
Conservative win (new seat)				

=== Kingsbridge ===
South Hams District Council elections: Kingsbridge Ward, 2015
Party	Candidate	Votes	%	±%
Conservative	Keith Wingate	1,514	50.2%	
Conservative	Rufus Gilbert	1,513	50.1%	
Green	Joss Webber	768	25.5%	
Liberal Democrats	Laurel Lawford	711	23.6%	
Rejected ballots		31	1.0%	
Turnout		3,048	64.1%	
Conservative win (new seat)				
Conservative win (new seat)				

=== Loddiswell & Aveton Gifford ===
South Hams District Council elections: Loddiswell & Aveton Gifford Ward, 2015
Party	Candidate	Votes	%	±%
Conservative	Ian Bramble	1,072	66.9%	
Green	Christopher Noakes	531	33.1%	
Rejected ballots		23	1.4%	
Turnout		1,626	76.3%	
Conservative win (new seat)				

=== Marldon & Littlehempston ===
South Hams District Council elections: Marldon & Littlehempston Ward, 2015
Party	Candidate	Votes	%	±%
Conservative	Trevor Pennington	1,098	64.3%	
Green	Christine Adams	359	21.0%	
Liberal Democrats	David Robinson	251	14.7%	
Rejected ballots		24	1.4%	
Turnout		1,732	72.9%	
Conservative win (new seat)				

=== Newton & Yealmpton ===
South Hams District Council elections: Newton & Yealmpton Ward, 2015
Party	Candidate	Votes	%	±%
Liberal Democrats	Keith Baldry	1,762	47.8%	
Conservative	Ian Blackler	1,537	41.7%	
Conservative	Suzie Cooper	1,417	38.4%	
Green	John Green	1,083	29.4%	
Rejected ballots		27	0.7%	
Turnout		3,715	74.9%	
Liberal Democrats win (new seat)				
Conservative win (new seat)				

=== South Brent ===
South Hams District Council elections: South Brent Ward, 2015
Party	Candidate	Votes	%	±%
Conservative	Robert Steer	1,644	51.4%	
Conservative	Peter Smerdon	1,584	49.5%	
Green	Tony Kuhl	1,159	36.2%	
Labour	Kim Gray	627	19.6%	
Labour	Rosie Adams	599	18.7%	
Rejected ballots		30	0.9%	
Turnout		3228	75.7%	
Conservative win (new seat)				
Conservative win (new seat)				

=== Stokenham ===
South Hams District Council elections: Stokenham Ward, 2015
Party	Candidate	Votes	%	±%
Liberal Democrats	Julian Brazil	909	53.5%	
Conservative	Josh Gardner	643	37.9%	
Green	Tom Hoeksma	146	8.6%	
Rejected ballots		13	0.8%	
Turnout		1,711	76.0%	
Liberal Democrats win (new seat)				

=== Totnes (3) ===
South Hams District Council elections: Totnes Ward, 2015
Party	Candidate	Votes	%	±%
Green	Robert Vint	2,215	45.6%	
Green	Barrie Wood	1,839	37.9%	
Labour	David Horsburgh	1,265	26.1%	
Liberal Democrats	John Birch	1,150	23.7%	
Labour	Eleanor Cohen	1,137	23.4%	
Labour	Tony Whitty	1,111	22.9%	
Conservative	Ralph Clark	928	19.1%	
Conservative	Angela Shropshall-Clark	815	16.8%	
Conservative	Michael Footitt	754	15.5%	
UKIP	Alan Langmaid	693	14.3%	
TUSC	Alex Moore	349	7.2%	
Rejected ballots		53	1.1%	
Turnout		4,906	70.8%	
Green win (new seat)				
Green win (new seat)				
Labour win (new seat)				

=== Wembury and Brixton (2) ===
South Hams District Council elections: Wembury and Brixton Ward, 2015
Party	Candidate	Votes	%	±%
Conservative	Daniel Brown	1,530	55.7%	−13.0
Conservative	Basil Fernley Cane	1,380	50.2%	−13.3
Liberal Democrats	Richard Robinson	571	20.8%	+20.8
Green	Katy Ward-Edwards	558	20.3%	+20.3
Labour	Anna Malone	526	19.1%	+19.1
Rejected ballots		25	0.9%	
Turnout		2,774	73.8%	+23.0
Conservative hold		Swing		
Conservative hold		Swing		

=== West Dart ===
South Hams District Council elections: West Dart Ward, 2015
Party	Candidate	Votes	%	±%
Conservative	John Tucker	831	52.4%	
Green	Ian Donaldson	520	32.8%	
Liberal Democrats	Richard Heseltine	235	14.8%	
Rejected ballots		18	1.1%	-4.5
Turnout		1,604	74.6%	
Conservative win (new seat)				

=== Woolwell ===
South Hams District Council elections: Woolwell Ward, 2015
Party	Candidate	Votes	%	±%
Conservative	Nicky Hopwood	1,068	69.8%	
Green	Christopher Lindsay	460	30.1%	
Rejected ballots		33	2.1%	
Turnout		1,562	65.0%	
Conservative win (new seat)				
