= Richard Peek =

British tea merchant, abolitionist, philanthropist and sheriff

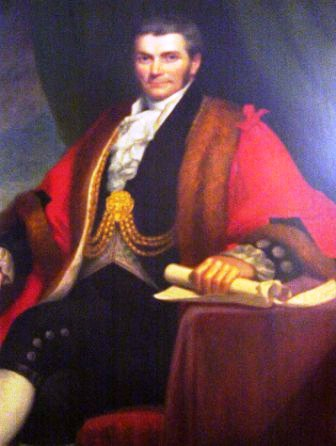
- Peek as Sheriff in 1832-33, age 50-51
- Born: October 3, 1782; Hazelwood, Loddiswell
- Died: March 7, 1867 (aged 84); Kingsbridge, Devon
- Resting place: Hazelwood, Devon
- Occupation: Tea merchant
- Known for: Philanthropy, Tea Merchancy
- Spouse: none
- Parent(s): John and Susannah Peek

Richard Peek (3 October 1782 - 7 March 1867) was a tea merchant in London from modest beginnings in Loddiswell in Devon. He rose to be one of the Sheriffs of the City of London. He was a known abolitionist and philanthropist in his home area. Whilst sheriff he sent a missionary into Newgate Prison.

== Biography ==
Peek was born 3 October 1782 at Halsenwood villa (later Hazelwood) to John and his wife Susannah (née Foxworthy). Peek left his birthplace in Loddiswell to go to Plymouth where he worked for a grocer. He reputedly walked to London and met a Quaker who arranged for his new employment at a tea merchants called Sanderson and Barklay. Peek did so well that not only was he promoted but two of his brothers also travelled up from Devon to join the trade. The three brothers, Richard, William and James Peek eventually set up their own firm in 1823 (after William initially led the way with a family business in 1818).

The business prospered as the East India Company's monopoly on the importation of tea ended and Peek Bros and Co. set up offices in Liverpool. This firm was still in business in 1958 trading as Peek Bros. and Winch. Peek was elected to be on the Corporation of London and subsequently one of the Sheriffs of the City of London in 1832. During his tenure as Sheriff he funded a missionary to visit the prisoners in Newgate Prison. He was also noted for his hatred of capital punishment and it was said that he would meet the Secretary of State at odd hours in an attempt to intercede on behalf of the condemned. The Secretary of State at the time was Robert Peel.

Peek had built a home called Hazelwood in his home village and had moved his father into the house. This house was on the same site of a previous building where Richard was born.

The partnership between the Peek brothers in Liverpool was dissolved "by mutual consent" on 30 May 1834 when Richard retired from the business. The remaining business was in Eastcheap in London. He retired from that as well on 21 December 1838.

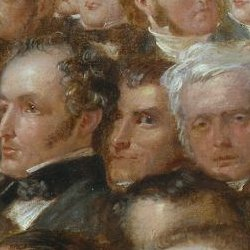
Peek at the World's Anti-Slavery Convention in 1840. He is in the centre of this extract behind John Sturge, the brother of the organiser

Peek was on the organising committee and attended the 1840 World's Anti-slavery convention in London and he was included in the painting which is now in the National Portrait Gallery in London.

The second international Anti-Slavery convention was in 1843 when Peek was a vice-president of the convention with other notables including John Cropper who had also had a business in Liverpool. Peek took the chair of the convention when Samuel Gurney had to leave.

Peek was reported as being an instigator of The Patriot magazine which did much for forwarding abolitionism in Britain.

One of his gifts was a contribution towards a chapel at Dodbrooke in Kingsbridge, which was to be used by the Bible Christians; in addition, he supplied weekly free medical attention in his home village as well as funding a news and reading room in 1839.

After he retired back to Loddiswell he became a magistrate known for his philanthropy. He gave land for a local school in 1841 and later gave land to fund its upkeep. The British School was founded in 1853. Early records show that the fees of many early students were met by the school. This building is still the local primary school.

Peek died 7 March 1867, without issue, in Kingsbridge and an alabaster pulpit was paid for in his memory and erected at his local church. He was buried in the catacombs under Hazelwood.
