= John Cranch =

John Cranch may refer to:

- John Cranch (naturalist) (1758–1816), English naturalist and explorer
- John Cranch (American painter) (1807–1891), American painter
- John Cranch (English painter) (1751–1821), English painter

== See also ==
- John Cranch Walker Vivian
