= South Hams Hospital =

- University Hospitals Plymouth NHS Trust
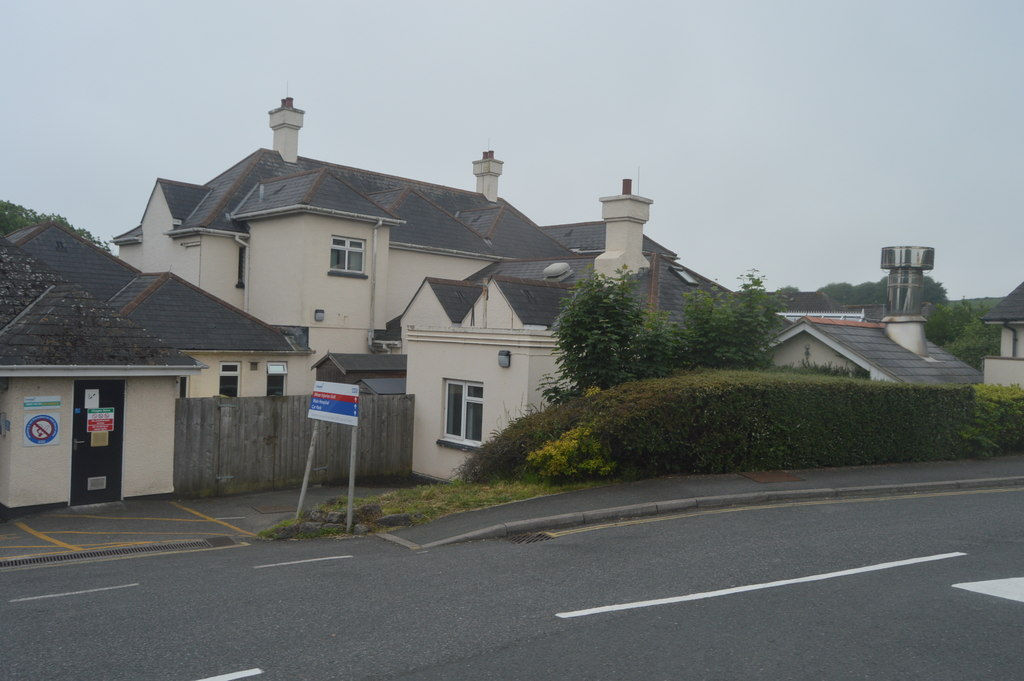
- South Hams Hospital

- Shown in Devon

Geography
- Location: Plymouth Road, Kingsbridge, Devon, England
- Coordinates: 50.2892°N 3.7836°W

Organisation
- Care system: NHS
- Type: Community

History
- Founded: 1929

Links
- Lists: Hospitals in England

South Hams Hospital is a health facility in Plymouth Road, Kingsbridge, Devon, England. It is managed by University Hospitals Plymouth NHS Trust and formerly by Torbay and South Devon NHS Foundation Trust.

== History ==
The facility was opened by the Bishop of Exeter as the Kingsbridge, Salcombe and District Cottage Hospital in April 1929. In 1932, Emma José Townsend, a visitor to the hospital, was awarded the Empire Gallantry Medal for trying to prevent a farmer from murdering his son with a shotgun in one of the wards. It joined the National Health Service in 1948 and subsequently became known as South Hams Hospital.
