= Kingsbridge Town Hall =

Municipal building in Kingsbridge, Devon, England

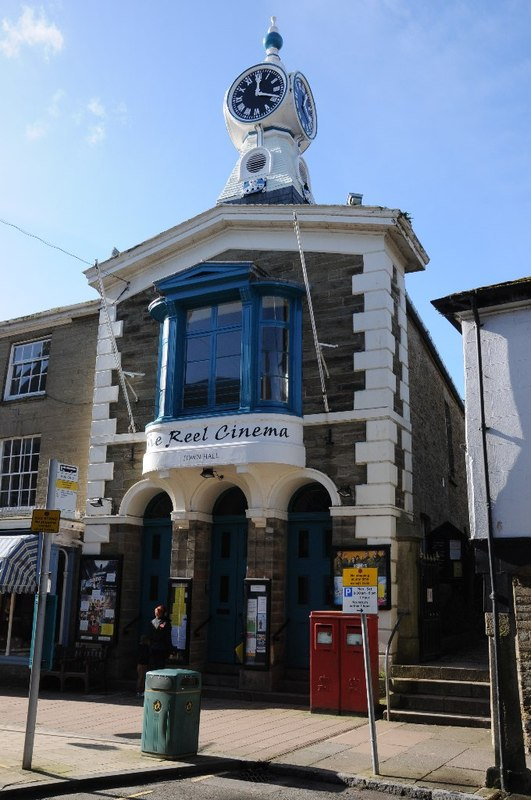
- Kingsbridge Town Hall

- Shown in Devon
- 50.2856°N 3.7781°W
- Location: Fore Street, Kingsbridge

History
- Built: 1850

Site notes
- Architectural style: Neoclassical style

Listed Building – Grade II
- Official name: Town Hall
- Designated: 31 October 1972
- Reference no.: 1107527

Kingsbridge Town Hall is a municipal building in Fore Street, Kingsbridge, Devon, England. The town hall, which is currently used as a cinema, is a Grade II listed building.

== History ==
The town hall was built and financed by a specially formed company known as the Kingsbridge Private Rooms Company. It was designed in the neoclassical style, built in ashlar stone and was completed in 1850. The design involved a symmetrical main frontage facing onto Fore Street; the building was arcaded on the ground floor, so that butter and poultry could be sold, with an assembly room on the first floor. There were three round headed openings on the ground floor, a canted oriel window on the first floor and an obtuse angled pediment at roof level. Internally, as well as the public rooms, the facilities included offices for the local constabulary and a lock-up for petty criminals.

By the 1860s the town hall was being used as a drill hall by the 26th (Kingsbridge) Devonshire Rifle Volunteer Corps; it was also being used as a courthouse for petty session and county court hearings and science classes were being held in the building. A clock turret in the shape of a cube with three circular faces and a finial was placed on the roof of the building in 1875. Local tradition has it that the clock was not given a western face so that the labourers in the Kingsbridge Union Workhouse would not be able to count the minutes until the end of their shift; a more likely explanation is simply that the western side of the clock was used for maintenance access.

Following significant population growth, largely associated with the status of Kingsbridge as a market town, the area became an urban district in 1894. The council acquired the building from the original shareholders allowing the company to be wound up in the early 20th century. Soldiers from the 3rd (Special Reserve) Battalion, the King's Own Royal Regiment (Lancaster), based at Saltash in Cornwall, were entertained to a concert in the town hall in December 1914 during the First World War.

The town hall ceased to be the meeting place of the local council when it moved to Quay House in the 1950s. The building was converted for use as a theatre in 1980 and then fitted out for use as a cinema in 1997: it then operated as a community cinema under the Reel Cinema brand from May 2000, and after being acquired by Merlin Entertainments, was re-branded as the Kings Cinema in July 2015.
