= Lutton, South Brent =

Hamlet in Devon, England

Coordinates: 50.437°N 3.837°W

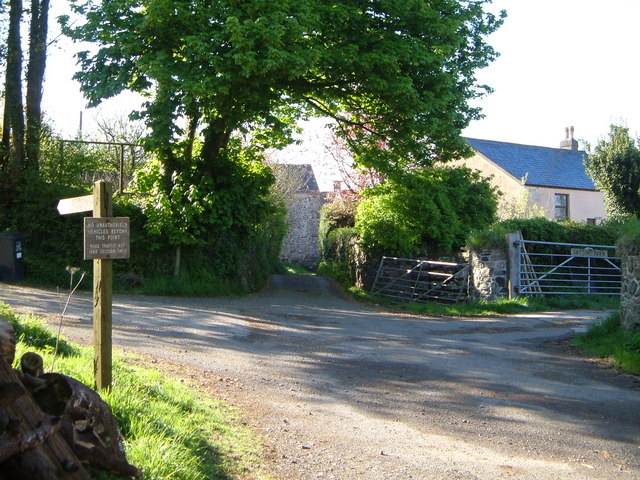
Higher Lutton

Lutton is a small farming hamlet on the outskirts of South Brent, Devon, England. It is a hillside community on the side of Brent Hill. It is only a small hamlet of about 15 people.

Lutton is split into 2 sections, split by a minor road. The lower side is larger, with a terrace and a large detached house. Higher Lutton has a Farmhouse (that has been split into two smaller houses, one of which is rented out), a large house and a recent barn conversion.

Lutton Farm is a dairy farm situated in Higher Lutton. It has over 50 acres of pasture land, mainly grazed by cattle.

There is also a village with the same name near Cornwood in Devon with a pub and church.
