= Brent Hill =

Iron Age hill fort site in Devon, England

Coordinates: 50.44051°N 3.82772°W

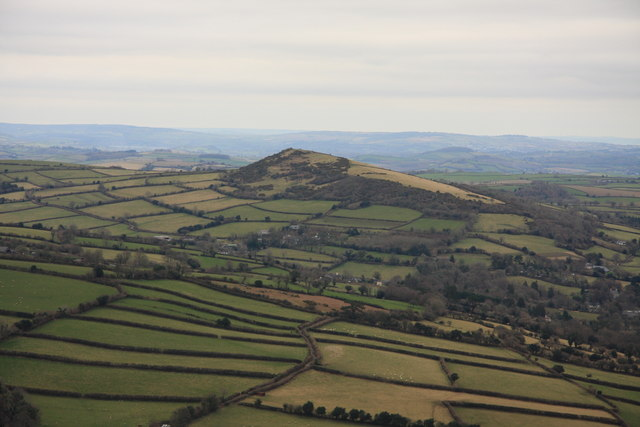
Brent Hill.

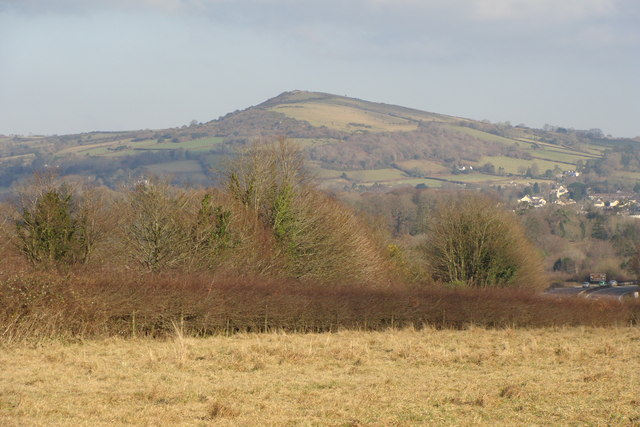
Brent Hill.

Brent Hill is the site of an Iron Age hill fort situated close to South Brent in Devon, England. The fort occupies the top of Brent Hill at approx 311 metres (1,020 ft) above Sea Level.
