= Fosse Copse =

Woodland in Devon, England

- Location within Devon
- Interactive map of Fosse Copse

Geography
- Location: Devon, England
- OS grid: SX719479
- Coordinates: 50.317°N 3.799°W
- Area: 1.88 hectares (4.65 acres)

Administration
- Authority: Woodland Trust

Fosse Copse is a woodland in Devon, England, near the village of Loddiswell. It covers a total area of 1.88 hectares (4.65 acres) on the west facing slope of the Avon Valley. It is owned and managed by the Woodland Trust. There is no public access.
