= Emma Jose Townsend =

Emma José Townsend (1869 – 8 March 1965) was a British recipient of the Empire Gallantry Medal.

Born in Leicester in 1869, Townsend moved to Devon in 1926 together with her two sisters. In May 1932, one of her sisters, Elizabeth, was seriously ill in Kingsbridge Cottage Hospital. On 7 May, Emma was visiting her when she heard screaming from the next ward. One of the patients in the next ward was nine-year old William Yeoman, who was being assaulted by his father, William Jarvis Yeoman. Mr Yeoman had arrived at the hospital with a shotgun concealed under a coat with the intention of shooting his son. He was interrupted by a nurse but managed to fire at his son before striking him with the gun; it was the boy's screams that Emma Townsend had heard. Without hesitation, Townsend attempted to disarm Yeoman but each time she tried, he pushed her aside, on one occasion striking her with the gun, causing a scalp wound. Yeoman eventually broke away and ran from the hospital.

Yeoman was captured by the police some hours later, but in the meantime had murdered his wife and other two children. William died two days later from injuries inflicted during the assault. Emma Townsend was treated for the head wound and later discharged.

Yeoman was charged with the murders of his family and the attempted murder of Emma Townsend. He was tried at Devon Assizes in June 1932 and found guilty but insane; he was ordered to be detained during His Majesty's pleasure. Giving evidence, Miss Townsend described her actions by saying, "I did my best". The trial judge, Mr Justice Charles, responded, "I think you acted with great courage".

On 6 September 1932, the award of the Empire Gallantry Medal to Emma Townsend was published in the London Gazette. The citation ran:

On the 9th May, 1932, W. J. Yeoman, a farmer of Kingsbridge, South Devon, murdered one of his sons in the South Hams Cottage Hospital at Kingsbridge. The boy, aged 9, was an inmate under treatment at the Hospital and Yeoman attacked him as he lay in bed, first firing at him with a gun and then striking him with it several times. Miss Townsend, who was visiting her sister at the Hospital, heard cries of "Help" and went into the ward. She showed great courage in trying to prevent the killing of the boy and behaved most gallantly. In the struggle Yeoman struck her with the barrel of the gun and cut her head open. It was necessary afterwards to stitch up the wound and she lost a quantity of blood.

— "No. 33861". The London Gazette. 6 September 1932. p. 5687.

In subsequent interviews, Townsend maintained that she did no more than anyone else would have done in the circumstances. She was reluctant to talk about the incident as her sister had died only a few days afterwards.

Like all recipients of the Empire Gallantry Medal, Townsend's medal was exchanged for the George Cross after its introduction in 1940. Miss Townsend was one of four women to be awarded the Empire Gallantry Medal. The George Cross was sold to a private collector of medals for £13,000 in 2024.
