= River Avon, Devon =

River in Devon, England

Avon Aune
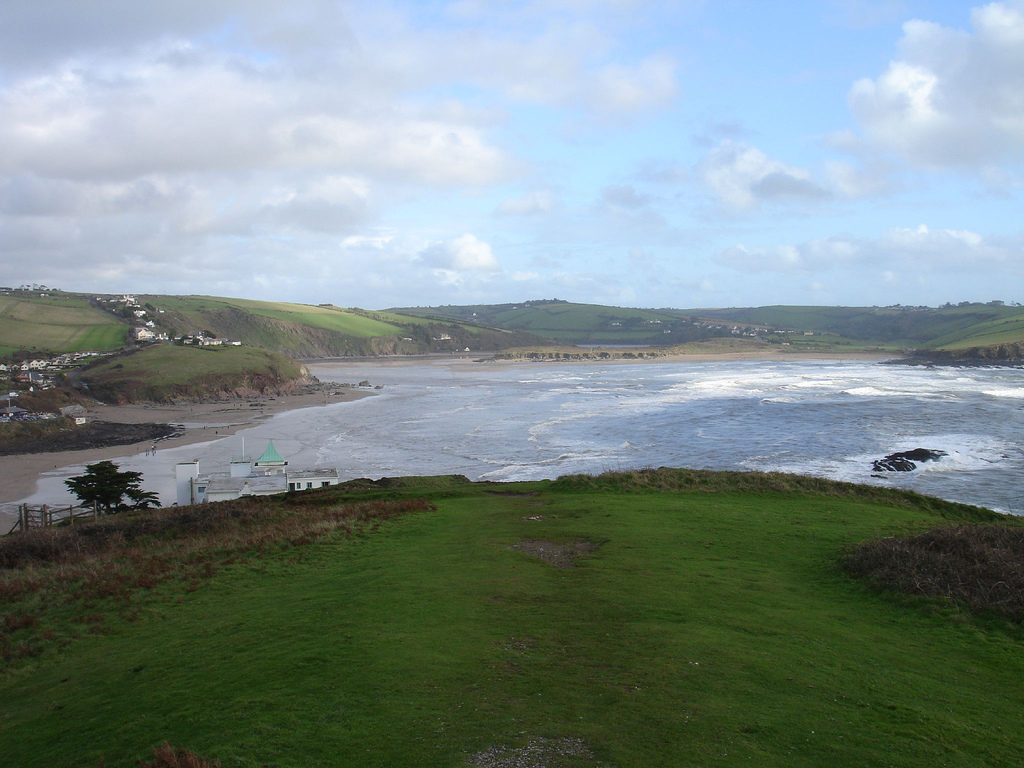
- The mouth of the River Avon, seen from Burgh Island

Location
- Country: England
- Region: Devon

Physical characteristics
- Source
  - location: near Ryder's Hill, Dartmoor
  - coordinates: 50.5101°N 3.9047°W
  - elevation: 475 m (1,558 ft)
- Mouth: English Channel
  - location: Bigbury-on-Sea
  - coordinates: 50.2798°N 3.8877°W
  - elevation: 0 m (0 ft)
- Length: 41 km (25 mi)

The River Avon, also known as the River Aune, is a river in the county of Devon in the southwest of England. It rises in the southern half of Dartmoor National Park in an area of bog to the west of Ryder's Hill. Close to where the river leaves Dartmoor a dam was built in 1957 to form the Avon reservoir (see Dartmoor reservoirs). After leaving the moor it passes through South Brent and then Avonwick and Aveton Gifford and flows into the sea at Bigbury-on-Sea. Near Loddiswell the valley flows through Fosse Copse, a 1.88 hectares (4.65 acres) woodland owned and managed by the Woodland Trust.

The estuary lies within the South Devon Area of Outstanding Natural Beauty and is part of the South Devon Heritage Coast.

From 1893 until its closure in 1963, the Kingsbridge branch line railway line ran along the valley of the Avon between Kingsbridge and South Brent.

== See also ==
- Rivers of the United Kingdom
