= Kingsbridge Cookworthy Museum =

Rural Life Museum in Devon, England

Coordinates: 50.2874°N 3.7780°W

Kingsbridge Cookworthy Museum is a local museum covering the history and culture of the South Hams area and is located at the top of Fore Street in Kingsbridge, Devon, England. Its extensive displays range from prehistoric times to the modern day.

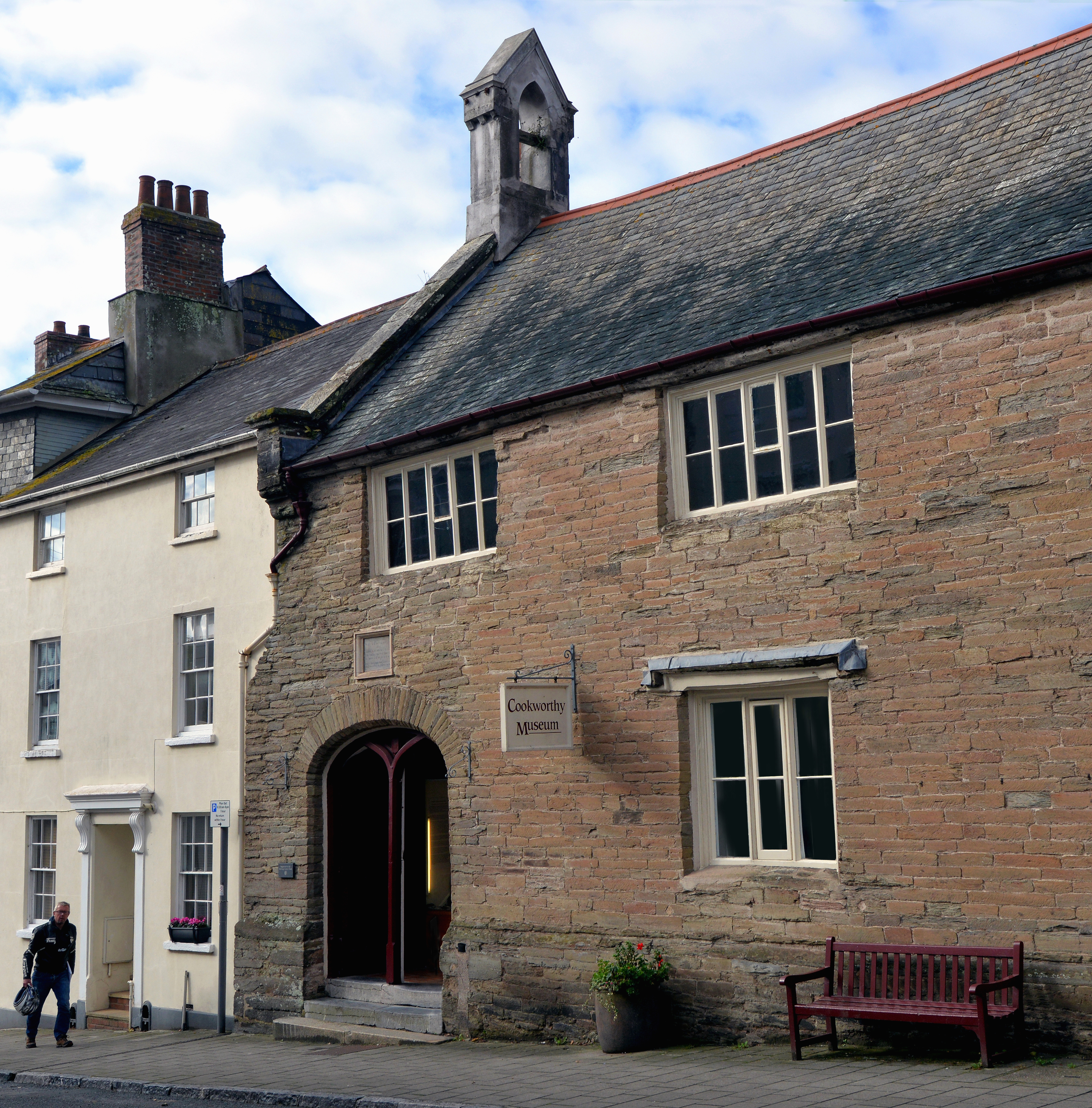
Exterior view of Kingsbridge Cookworthy Museum

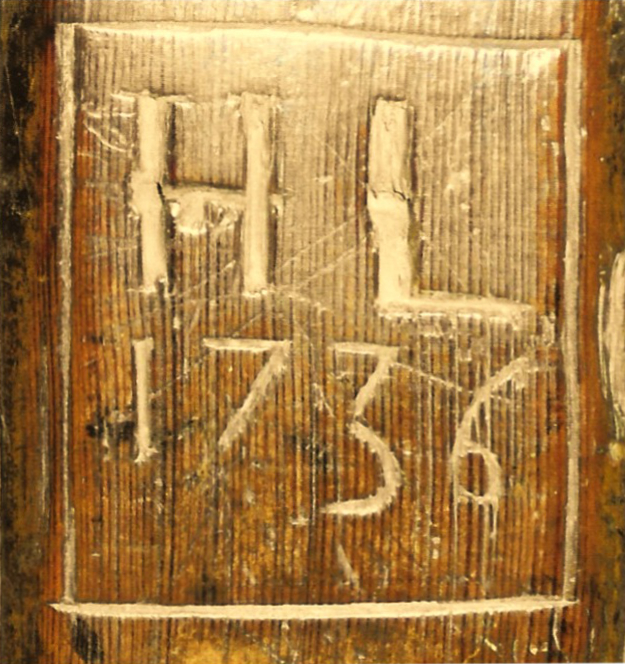
Historic graffiti in the Cookworthy Room

== History ==
Kingsbridge Cookworthy Museum was opened in 1972 in derelict buildings once occupied by Kingsbridge Grammar School. Following a local campaign, English China Clays Ltd rescued the building and founded the museum. They also – along with the local council – contributed to its running costs. The Museum was named after William Cookworthy (1705 – 1780). He was born in Kingsbridge, and went on to base himself in Plymouth. There, he developed the first true hard-paste porcelain, receiving a patent for it on 17 March 1768.

The building was founded by Thomas Crispin who was born in Kingsbridge in 1608. He moved to Exeter in 1630, where he became prominent in the wool trade and Master of the Company of Weavers, Fullers and Shearers. As a thanksgiving to his home town, Crispin bought land at the top of Fore Street where, in 1670, he built the Grammar School for the inhabitants of Kingsbridge. The School had two large rooms fronting onto Fore Street and a house was built for the School Master.

In 1689 in his will he left monies, namely: "£5 a year for repairs; £15 for the head master, in consideration of his teaching at least 15 free scholars in classical learning; and £10 to a master for teaching 25 poor children to read and 12 to write. To provide for these payments, he left a farm of 72 acres at Bradninch (near Cullompton) now worth about £40 a year."

The first Headmaster was William Duncombe of Brickhill in Buckinghamshire. He took up his appointment on 14 June 1671 and taught at the School until his death in 1698. He is buried in St. Edmund's Church.

== Notable exhibits ==
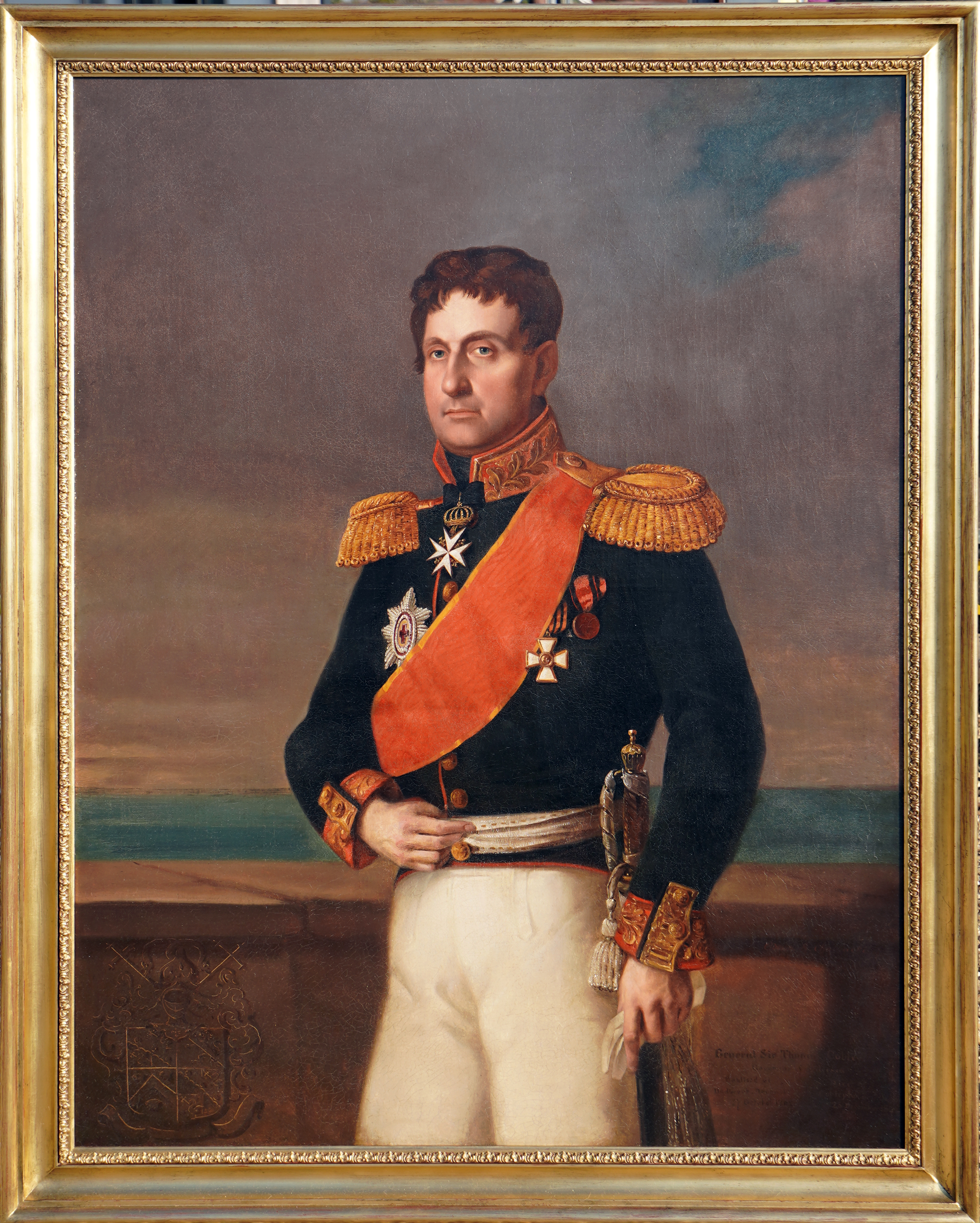
Portrait of Thomas Cobley - after cleaning and restoration

One particular exhibit of note is a painting of Thomas Cobley. He was born in the local parish of Dodbrooke in 1761 – the son of the vicar at the time (Benjamin Cobley, whose name appears as the Rector of St Thomas à Becket) – and, following the early death of his father, he was obliged to leave home and seek his fortune.

He moved to Russia and specifically to Odesa (now Ukraine) where he worked in military service during the time of Catherine II (“The Great”). By 1792 he was a lieutenant-colonel and was given 32,000 acres of land on the left bank of the Odesa estuary as a reward for his historic participation against the Ottoman Empire. In 1801 he became an Odesa City Councillor and between 1811-1812 fought selflessly against a plague which took the lives of several thousand of the city’s inhabitants including almost all the doctors and pharmacists. He became Head of Administration between 1814-1815 and the citizens of Odesa marked their gratitude to him by naming one of the local streets Coblevskaya in his honour.

The painting in the Cookworthy Museum is a copy commissioned by Thomas Cobley’s great nephew (John von Sonntag Havilland) from Romuald Choinaki in c. 1850 of an original by Carl Reichel from 1819. The original painting, prior to the current Ukraine / Russia conflict, was displayed in the Odesa Art Museum which is currently in a war zone. Its current location is therefore unknown.

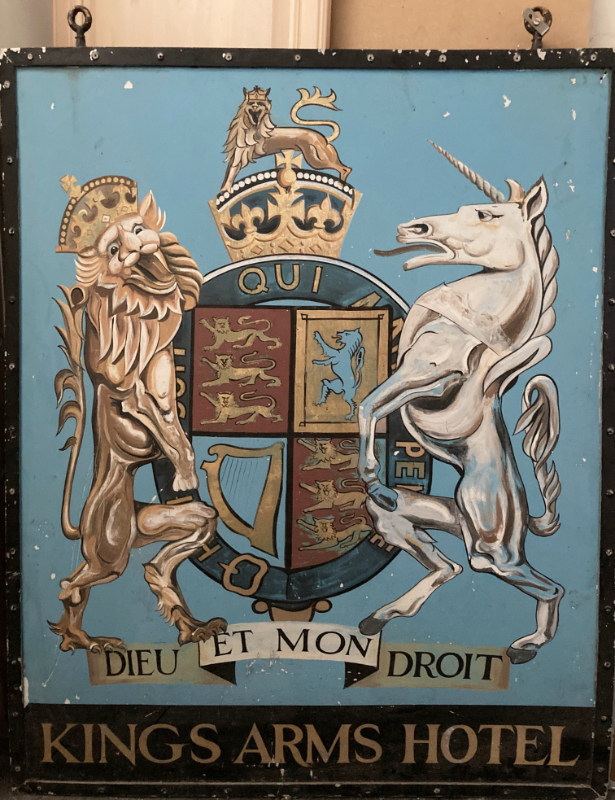
Exterior sign from the now-closed Kings Arms Hotel in Fore Street

== Exhibitions ==
In recent seasons, the Cookworthy Museum has mounted various exhibitions, the titles of which have included Six Weeks To Go (about the evacuation of local villages such as Blackawton, Slapton and Torcross to allow American troops to rehearse on Slapton Sands for the D-Day landings in Normandy), Music in the South Hams (musical societies, brass bands, choral groups, the local Morris Men and performers at the annual Food & Music Festival in the Town Square), On The Rocks (wrecks and rescue of ships on the South Hams Coast) and The Image and the Place - Kingsbridge 1939-1945 (a photographic exhibition commemorating World War II and the 80th anniversary victory in Europe). The most recent exhibition is William Cookworthy - A Man of No Common Clay (the life and times of Kingsbridge's William Cookworthy who was a pharmacist, a scientist, an innovator, a Quaker as well as the "Father of English porcelain").
