= Kingsbridge Community College =

Kingsbridge Academy
- School Coat of Arms

Location
- Balkwill Road; Kingsbridge, Devon, TQ7 1PL; England
- Coordinates: 50.28084°N 3.78316°W

Information
- Type: Academy
- Established: 1670 (Kingsbridge Grammar School); 1964
- Department for Education URN: 136367 Tables
- Ofsted: Reports
- Chair of Governors: Jeremy Fothergill
- Principal: Tina Graham
- Gender: Co-educational
- Age: 11 to 18
- Website: http://www.kingsbridgecollege.org.uk/

Kingsbridge Community College is a co-educational secondary school and sixth form with academy status, located in Kingsbridge in the English county of Devon.

The school was initially founded in 1670 as the Kingsbridge Grammar School, providing for boarding and day pupils. It occupied a house in the town, which is now the Kingsbridge Cookworthy Museum. In 1931 the school moved to a new site (though the old school was still used for dinners) and in 1944 admitted girls for the first time. In 1964 the school was merged with a secondary modern school to become a comprehensive foundation school administered by Devon County Council, and then converted to academy status on 1 January 2011. However the school continues to coordinate with Devon County Council for admissions.

Kingsbridge Community College offers GCSEs and BTECs as programmes of study for pupils, while students in the sixth form have the option to study from a range of A Levels, NVQs and further BTECs.
