= 1999 South Hams District Council election =

1999 UK local government election

← 1995	6 May 1999	2003 →

All 40 seats in the South Hams District Council 21 seats needed for a majority
- Turnout: 41.9%
	First party	Second party
Party	Conservative	Liberal Democrats
Seats won	29	4
Percentage	46.7%	20.2%
	Third party	Fourth party
Party	Independent	Labour
Seats won	4	3
Percentage	19.9%	12.9%
- Map showing the results of the 1999 South Hams District Council elections.
Council control before election
No overall control
Council control after election
Conservative

Elections to South Hams District Council took place on 6 May 1999, the same day as other United Kingdom local elections. This was the first election to be held under new ward boundaries, with the number of seats reduced from 44 to 40 The Conservative Party gained overall control of the council, which had previously been under no overall control.
