= Kingsbridge branch line =

UK railway branch line

Kingsbridge branch line was a single track branch line railway in Devon, England. The railway, which became known as the Primrose Line, opened in 1893 and, despite local opposition, closed in 1963. It left the Exeter to Plymouth line at Brent and ran 12 miles (19 km), following the route of the River Avon, to Kingsbridge. A proposed extension to Salcombe was not constructed.

== History ==
=== False starts ===
In 1849, the South Devon Railway reached Plymouth with its broad gauge railway, connecting South Devon to London over friendly associate railways.

People in Kingsbridge and the surrounding district felt cut off from the benefits of railway connection and, in 1854, an ambitious project was put forward at a public meeting: the line was to run from Churston to Kingsbridge. The meeting generated huge enthusiasm, but little money was forthcoming and the scheme went no further.

Kingsbridge Railway Act 1864
- Act of Parliament
- Parliament of the United Kingdom
- Long title: An Act for incorporating a Company, and for making and maintaining the Kingsbridge Railway; and for other Purposes.
- Citation: 27 & 28 Vict. c. cclxxxvii

Dates
- Royal assent: 29 July 1864

Text of statute as originally enacted

In January 1864, another meeting took place in Kingsbridge proposing a more modest scheme, from Brent station on the South Devon Railway main line to Salcombe via Kingsbridge. The cost of construction was to be £130,000, and this time tangible support was available. The scheme went to Parliament and was granted the Kingsbridge Railway Act 1864 (27 & 28 Vict. c. cclxxxvii).

Kingsbridge Railway (Deviations) Act 1866
- Act of Parliament
- Parliament of the United Kingdom
- Long title: An Act to enable the Kingsbridge Railway Company to make Deviations in and to alter the Levels of their authorized Railway; and for other Purposes.
- Citation: 29 & 30 Vict. c. cclxiv

Dates
- Royal assent: 23 July 1866

Text of statute as originally enacted

That early success was not followed up with much actual money but, two years later, several deviations were required and even more capital needed. The Kingsbridge Railway (Deviations) Act 1866 (29 & 30 Vict. c. cclxiv) of 23 July 1866 authorised additional capital of £60,000. A Mr Chambers was persuaded to be the contractor to the impecunious company and work started a year later, on 24 June 1867. In fact, very little was done (Note: MacDermot says (volume II, page 395) that "some four miles" were completed following the 1864 act.) and, in 1871, it was proposed to abandon the scheme due to lack of money.

=== A viable scheme at last ===
Kingsbridge and Salcombe Railway Act 1882
- Act of Parliament
- Parliament of the United Kingdom
- Long title: An Act for authorising the construction of a railway from the Brent Station of the Great Western Railway Company to Kingsbridge and Salcombe; and for other purposes.
- Citation: 45 & 46 Vict. c. clx

Dates
- Royal assent: 24 July 1882

Text of statute as originally enacted

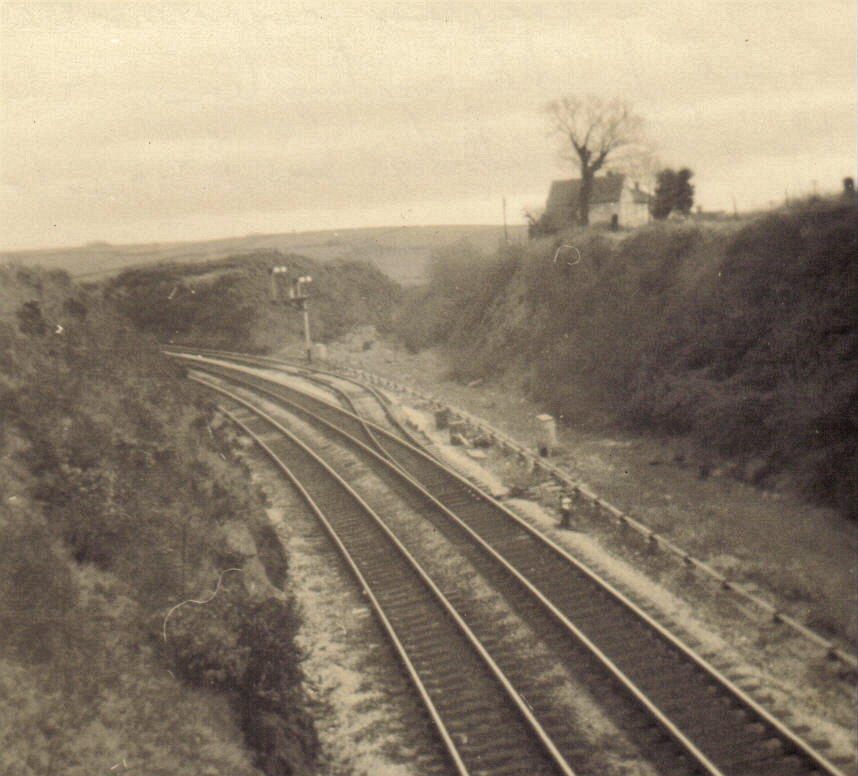
Site of the junction for Kingsbridge at South Brent.

Ten more years went by and a new Kingsbridge and Salcombe Railway was authorised by an act of Parliament, the Kingsbridge and Salcombe Railway Act 1882 (45 & 46 Vict. c. clx) of 24 July 1882. The new company purchased the rights of the earlier line for £3,500, which was to run to Ibberton Head at Salcombe. Capital was to be £160,000 for the 16-mile (26 km) line, and working arrangements were provisionally agreed with the Great Western Railway (GWR) which had, by then, absorbed the South Devon Railway.

Yet again enthusiastic planning was not matched by the raising of finance and, a year later, only £1,500 had been subscribed.

Clearly, nothing could be done in the circumstances, until, on 28 October 1885, discussions took place with the GWR about it taking over the scheme. A figure of £8,000 was tabled, increased to £10,000, which seemed to be acceptable at first. However, ambiguities arose over whether land supposed to have been acquired by the old company was legally owned. Further meetings dragged on at Paddington until, on 21 March 1888, the purchase of the unbuilt line was finally agreed. That was formally confirmed on 13 June 1888, and authorised by the Great Western Railway Act 1888 (51 & 52 Vict. c. cci).

=== Construction and opening ===
With the resources of the GWR behind the scheme, construction was able to proceed. The cost of the line, which included 48 bridges, was £180,000. It opened on 19 December 1893, 39 years after the project had first been proposed. Wrangaton station had been renamed Kingsbridge Road, but reverted to its original name on the same day.

Although Brent station lay at the foot of Dartmoor hills, the line leaving Brent fell steeply at 1 in 60 to Avonwick, and continued falling, less steeply, to Gara Bridge and almost to Loddiswell. Rising there at 1 in 50, it reached a summit at Sorley Tunnel, from where it fell again at 1 in 50 to Kingsbridge.

=== Wartime use ===
Field Marshal Montgomery used the line twice during World War II, firstly to review American troops training in the area and secondly, in 1944, during Exercise Tiger.

=== Closure ===
After the war, increasing use of road transport for goods and personal travel resulted in declining use of the branch line. Losses were stated to be £37,759 annually. The line closed to goods from 9 September 1963, and was intended to have closed completely on that date, but the change from summer to winter time tables of the Western National Omnibus Company, which was to provide the replacement service, was occurring the following weekend, so the closure of the line was delayed until then. The last train ran on 14 September 1963.
