= Loddiswell =

Village in Devon, England

Coordinates: 50.321°N 3.8°W

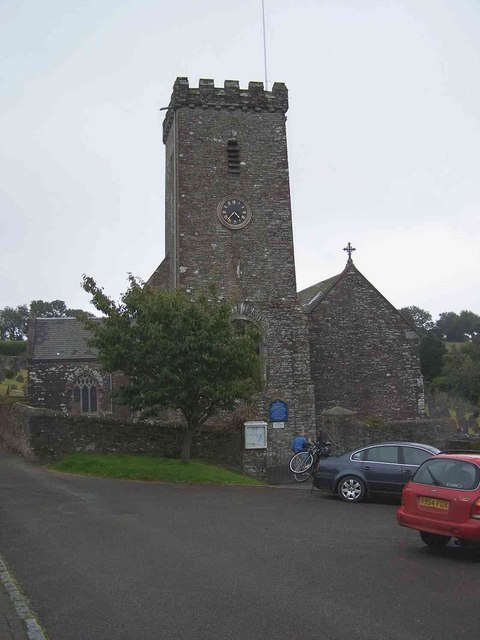
- St Michaels and All Angels

- Location within Devon
- Population: small
- District: South Hams
- Shire county: Devon
- Region: South West
- Country: England
- Sovereign state: United Kingdom
- Police: Devon and Cornwall
- Fire: Devon and Somerset
- Ambulance: South Western

Loddiswell is a parish and village in the South Hams district of Devon, England. It lies on the west side of the River Avon or Aune and is three miles NNW from Kingsbridge. There is evidence of occupation going back to Roman times. The village's most famous son and benefactor was Richard Peek (1782-1867), a tea merchant who retired here after being one of the Sheriffs of London. The name Loddiswell is a corruption of Saint Loda's well, named after one of the many saints that occurred all over the westcountry, especially in Cornwall.

== History ==
There is evidence at the northern end of this parish that Blackdown hill was used by the Romans, on the hill Blackdown Rings, a ring-and-bailey hill fort, may be the remains of a wooden fortress of the 12th century, not otherwise documented. The hill itself gives a commanding view of the area.

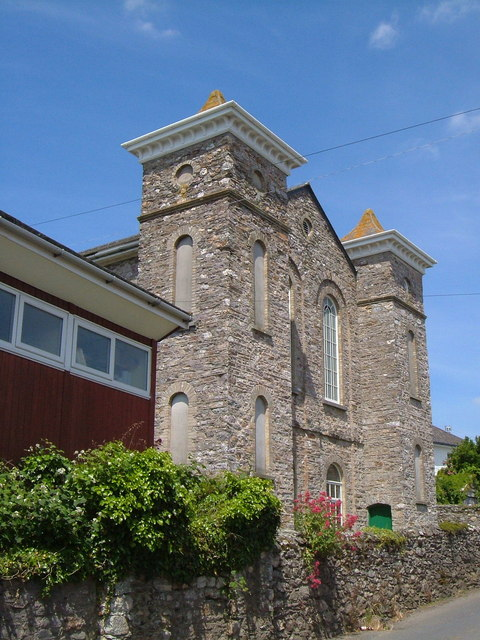
The 1864 chapel

Loddiswell was mentioned in the Domesday Book in 1086 when the manor was valued at 100 shillings. The manor then belonged to Juhel of Totnes, but had belonged to an Anglo Saxon called Heca before the Norman Conquest. Domesday recorded that there was a fishery that gave 30 salmon as geld.

The parish church of St. Michael's and All Angels, is of the 14th century, enlarged in the 15th century; its font is Norman. The source of the village's medieval prosperity was wool. Woolston House, the manor house of Staunton manor, is a 17th-century house built near the foundations of an earlier structure; rebuilt in the 18th century, it passed from the Wise/Wyse family to the Weymouth and Allin families.

A copper mine opened in the parish in 1825.

In 1848, the congregationists built a chapel funded by Richard Peek. This locally born philanthropist who retired to Loddiswell and built Hazlewood House (1830). also funded a local school (The British School), a reading and news room (1838) as well as giving to various other nearby chapels.

In 1850, the village had a population of 1,013 and the church (St Michaels) was then described as ancient. Yellow ochre was collected here for resale complementing the employment at the mine and the mill.

The Great Western Railway's Kingsbridge branch line arrived in 1893 with a stop at Loddiswell station. It was said that Loddiswell was a "brisk walk away" as in fact the station was closer to the less well known and smaller village of Woodleigh. The railway station continued through the steam age but by 1961 it was an unstaffed halt and in 1963 it closed for ever. Today the remains of the track is used as a walking route.

Modern Loddiswell is well served for a small village. There is still a post office, Mini Supermarket and village public house, the Loddiswell Inn. The South Devon Chilli Farm can be found just to the north of the village. Near the village is Fosse Copse a 1.88 hectares (4.65 acres) woodland on the west facing slope of the Avon Valley owned and managed by the Woodland Trust.

== Famous residents ==
- Richard Peek, tea merchant and philanthropist was born here in 1782.
