= 2003 South Hams District Council election =

2003 UK local government election

← 1999	1 May 2003	2007 →

All 40 seats in the South Hams District Council 21 seats needed for a majority
- Turnout: 41.9%
	First party	Second party
Party	Conservative	Liberal Democrats
Seats before	29	4
Seats won	28	7
Seat change	▼1	▲3
Popular vote	11,400	7,515
Percentage	48.3%	31.8%
	Third party	Fourth party
Party	Labour	Independent
Seats before	3	4
Seats won	3	2
Seat change	0	▼2
Popular vote	1,201	2,866
Percentage	5.1%	12.1%
- Map showing the results of the 2003 South Hams District Council elections.
Council control before election
No overall control
Council control after election
Conservative

Elections to South Hams District Council took place on 1 May 2003, the same day as other United Kingdom local elections. The whole council was up for election and the Conservative Party retained overall control of the council.
