= John Cranch (English painter) =

English painter

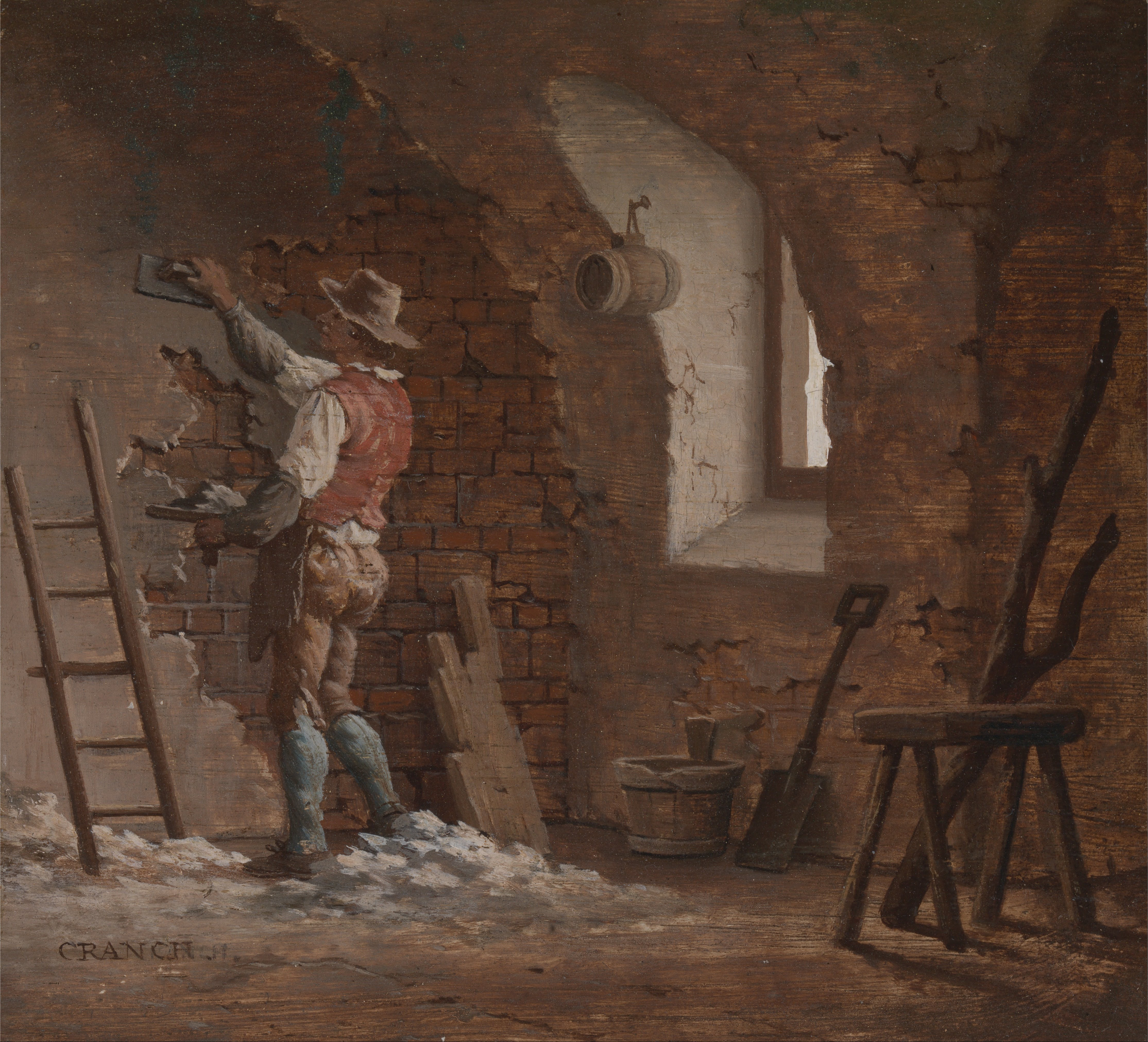
Plasterer, 1807, in the collection of the Yale Center for British Art

John Cranch (1751–1821), painter, born at Kingsbridge, Devonshire, 12 Oct. 1751, taught himself as a boy drawing, writing, and music, and while a clerk at Axminster also received instruction from a Roman Catholic priest. Inheriting some money, he came to London and painted portraits and historical pictures. He failed, however, to get a place on the walls of the Royal Academy, but was more successful at the Society of Artists, to which he contributed Burning of the Albion Mills, and at the British Institution, to which he contributed eight pictures in 1808. His best picture was The Death of Chatterton, now in the possession of Sir James Winter Lake, bart., who also owns a portrait of Cranch, which was engraved by John Thomas Smith. He is said to have excelled in "poker-pictures", and to have been befriended by Sir Joshua Reynolds. Reynolds in his youth had received valuable assistance from a Mr. and Mrs. Cranch of Plympton, Devonshire, who were doubtless relatives of John Cranch. He was elected a Foreign Honorary Member of the American Academy of Arts and Sciences in 1797 and a member of the American Antiquarian Society in 1818. After residing many years at Bath, Cranch died there in his seventieth year in February 1821. He published two works—On the Economy of Testaments (1794), and Inducements to promote the Fine Arts of Great Britain by exciting Native Genius to independent Effort and original Design (1811).There is a painting called Playing with Baby by him in the Victoria and Albert Museum.
