= 2007 South Hams District Council election =

2007 UK local government election

← 2003	3 May 2007	2011 →

All 40 seats in the South Hams District Council 21 seats needed for a majority
- Turnout: 47.0%
	First party	Second party	Third party
Party	Conservative	Liberal Democrats	Independent
Last election	28 seats, 48.3%	7 seats, 31.8%	2 seats, 12.1%
Seats won	28	9	3
Seat change	0	▲2	▲1
Popular vote	16,166	7,515	2,715
Percentage	50.2%	34.2%	8.4%
Swing	▲1.9%	▲2.4%	▼3.7%
- Map showing the results of the 2007 South Hams District Council elections.
Council control before election
No overall control
Council control after election
Conservative

Elections to South Hams District Council took place on 3 May 2007, the same day as other United Kingdom local elections. The whole council was up for election and the Conservative Party retained overall control of the council.
