= Woolwell =

Suburb of Plymouth, Devon

Coordinates: 50.434°N 4.100°W

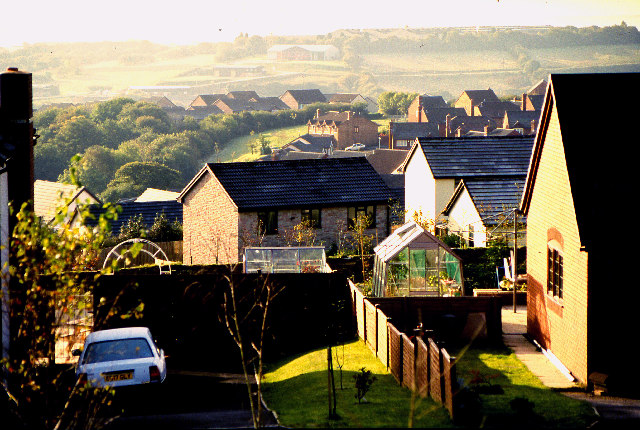
- View across houses in north-east Woolwell into the fields beyond

- Location within Devon
- Population: 3,098
- OS grid reference: SX5061
- Civil parish: Bickleigh
- District: South Hams
- Shire county: Devon
- Region: South West
- Country: England
- Sovereign state: United Kingdom
- Post town: PLYMOUTH
- Postcode district: PL6
- Dialling code: 01752
- Police: Devon and Cornwall
- Fire: Devon and Somerset
- Ambulance: South Western
- UK Parliament: South West Devon

Woolwell is a suburb on the north-east fringe of the city of Plymouth, England, located just outside the city's boundaries in the district of the South Hams. It is situated along the A386, close to the boundary of Dartmoor National Park, with good views of the surrounding landscape. Housing development began in Woolwell in 1981 and there is now a population of slightly over 3000. For an area of its size, it has a large number of facilities, including its own primary school, a medical centre and several shops.

== Geography ==
Accessed via a roundabout on the A386 Tavistock Road, Woolwell is situated in an area sometimes referred to collectively as Roborough. This is in reference to an historic village to the north of Woolwell, which can be reached directly by foot via Dark Lake Lane. Woolwell itself is surrounded almost entirely by undeveloped farm and woodland. The south and south-east sides of the neighbourhood slope downwards fairly steeply into wooded valleys that form part of the Bickleigh Vale Area of Great Landscape Value. Woolwell offers good views across these woods, and the extensive footpath routes are directly accessible from parts of the housing estate. There are also views into the edge of Dartmoor National Park, the boundary of which is nearby to Woolwell.

== Housing ==
There are a total of 1287 dwellings in Woolwell, located around a series of unconnected culs-de-sac, which branch off from Woolwell Road, the main road that runs through the centre of the neighbourhood. Residential areas immediately south of Woolwell Road are accessed via Long Park Drive, The Heathers or Woodend Road, with Cann Wood View providing access to further estates to the south-east. Access to housing at the north and east of Woolwell is via Pick Pie Drive.

The majority of houses in Woolwell were constructed between 1981 and 1995, built with red and brown brick in a style typical of the time. There are three small apartment blocks, but generally residences in Woolwell are detached or semi-detached houses. Of the occupied households in the area, 85% are privately owned. There are no listed buildings within Woolwell.

== Government ==
Woolwell is part of the civil parish of Bickleigh, within the Bickleigh and Shaugh ward of South Hams District Council. Even though it is considered part of Plymouth, it is therefore locally governed by Devon County Council rather than Plymouth City Council. It is within the parliamentary constituency of South West Devon.

There are Child Support Agency offices in the north of Woolwell.

== Demography ==
Woolwell has a total population of 3098, with an average household size of 2.4. Specific census data is not available for Woolwell individually, but only for the collective settlements of Woolwell, Roborough and Bickleigh. This data shows that, compared with Plymouth as a whole, the area has a higher proportion of under-15s (21%) and a lower proportion of over-65s (7%). The vast majority (95%) of the population is white British, with 78% of people identifying themselves as Christian; of the remainder, only 1% are of other faiths. Most people in the area consider themselves as having 'good' or 'fairly good' health, with comparatively few long-term illnesses. The rates of people with qualifications is higher at all levels than Plymouth as a whole, with only 14% of the population lacking formal qualifications. A higher proportion of people hold University degrees than the national average.

== Local amenities ==
Woolwell has a large number of facilities for its population. These are mostly located in a non-residential centre in the north of Woolwell, based around School Drive.

=== Education and healthcare ===
Bickleigh Down C of E Primary School, a Church of England voluntary aided primary school with a capacity of 406 places, is located on the left of School Drive. This school replaced the former church school at Bickleigh. St Cecilia's, a Church of England church within Bickleigh Parish (part of the Diocese of Exeter) meets in one of the school's halls. There is no secondary school in the area, so children from Woolwell attend a variety of schools in Plymouth, as well as some further afield such as Tavistock.

Opposite the school is Bambinos, a nursery school that was established in 1995 as the first of a group of child care centres now located across Plymouth. There are two other Ofsted-approved nursery schools in Woolwell. The oldest of these is Woolwell Under '5's, a pre-school founded in 1990, which is currently based in Woolwell Community Centre. Bumblebees Day Nursery, located west of the school, was established in September 2006.

Woolwell Medical Centre, situated next to Bambinos, is part of a National Health Service (NHS) Practice based at Lisson Grove in Mutley. The centre was built in 1990, as part of the Practice's move from its former premises in Estover and Mutley. As well as offering NHS services, the centre can also issue medical reports, insurance examinations, sick notes and prescriptions on a private basis. Behind the centre is Bickleigh Down Care Home, a private nursing home for the elderly currently owned by Four Seasons Health Care. This was purpose-built on the site in 1989.

=== Shopping and leisure ===
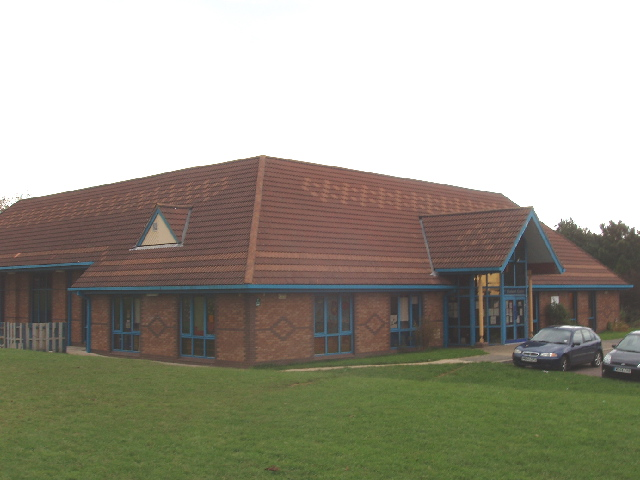
The Woolwell Centre

A small complex of six retail outlets is located at the end of School Drive. The largest of these is a branch of Premier, with a Post Office. There are also four takeaway restaurants and a hairdressers. A large Tesco Extra store is situated on the western boundary of Woolwell, with a recently built Lidl store opposite.

The Woolwell Centre (formerly Woolwell Community & Resource Centre) is situated north of these shops and is accessible via Dark Lake Lane. Built in 1997, it has several function rooms, which are used for conferences, activities, sports, and entertainment events. Woolwell Table Tennis Club, the largest in the South West of England, was founded in 1998 in the Community Centre, although it now meets in Eggbuckland Community College.

Woolwell has three playgrounds, and the largest of these is located next to the Community Centre. There is another in the south-east, adjacent to Cann Wood View, and the third is situated near to the shopping complex on School Road. There is also a small BMX track near to the Community Centre.

1st Roborough Scout Group meets in a scout hut behind the shops on School Drive, which was rebuilt following an arson attack in 2004. The Scouts used to hold an annual fireworks display for Guy Fawkes Night in the field behind the CSA building, but planning constraints due to the construction of the Lidl store meant that the last display of its kind was held in 2009.

=== Public services ===
Plymouth Citybus operate the 42C route which runs between Woolwell and Plymouth City Centre via The George, Derriford Hospital, Crownhill and Mutley Plain. Plymouth Citybus also runs the route 59 (Mondays - Saturdays), which serves Plympton, Lee Moor, Shaugh Prior, Bickleigh, Woolwell and the Park & Ride. Stagecoach SouthWest operates the routes 1/X1, which run between Tavistock and Plymouth via Horrabridge, Yelverton, Roborough and follows the same route as the 42C. The 1/X1/59 all bypass Woolwell and stop at Woolwell roundabout. On school days, Plymouth Citybus also operate an 807 service between Pick Pie Drive and Coombe Dean School.

A mobile library, operated by Devon County Council, visits Woolwell on alternate Friday mornings.

== Attitudes towards living in Woolwell ==
According to a consultation organised jointly in 2009 by the Councils of South Hams District, Plymouth and Devon, the attractive countryside surroundings are one of the best features of Woolwell, as are the range of facilities. Generally, Woolwell residents also consider the area to be safe place to live. However, in this survey, opinions were expressed about the lack of a sense of community in Woolwell. Issues raised included the lack of indoor meeting places, the lack of facilities for young people, and the poor design of Woolwell as a whole, particularly with regard to the non-central location of amenities and the numerous culs-de-sac which comprise the neighbourhood.
