= South Brent =

Village in Devon, England

Coordinates: 50°25′31″N 3°49′52″W

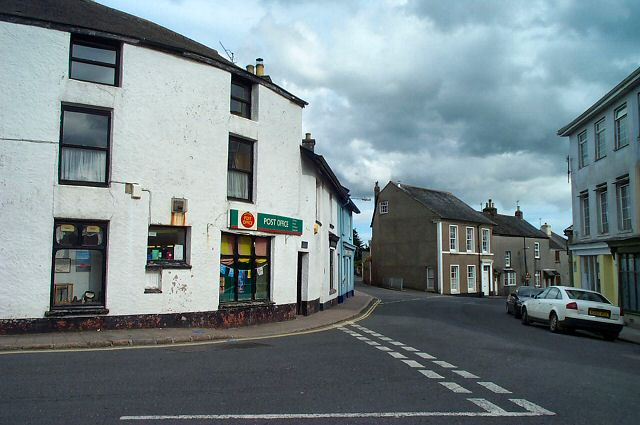
- The old post office, now closed, and crossroads in South Brent

- Location within Devon
- Population: 2,822 (2011)
- OS grid reference: SX697603
- Civil parish: South Brent
- District: South Hams
- Shire county: Devon
- Region: South West
- Country: England
- Sovereign state: United Kingdom
- Post town: SOUTH BRENT
- Postcode district: TQ10
- Dialling code: 01364
- Police: Devon and Cornwall
- Fire: Devon and Somerset
- Ambulance: South Western
- UK Parliament: Totnes
- Website: South Brent community website

South Brent is a large village on the southern edge of Dartmoor, England, in the valley of the River Avon. The parish includes the small hamlets of Aish, Harbourneford, Lutton, Brent Mill, and many scattered farmhouses. It is five miles (8 km) north-east of Ivybridge and 14 miles (22 km) east-northeast of Plymouth.

== History ==
On the high moorlands are many hut circles, enclosures, and barrows, all dating from the Bronze Age. The manor of Brent belonged to Buckfast Abbey from the time of the foundation of the abbey in the early 11th century. It was bought at the Dissolution by Sir William Petre, a large receiver of monastic spoils in South Devon.

South Brent was originally a woollen and market centre with two annual fairs.

Brent Hill is the steep hill just outside the village from which it takes its name (Old English brant – steep). On it are the ruins of an ancient building, supposed to have been a chapel, and of a windmill built about 1790.

== Amenities ==
The village centre is within the boundaries of Dartmoor National Park. It is a thriving community with shops, pubs, businesses, primary school, village hall, sports ground and community centre.

South Brent primary school supports about 250 children. The buildings are modern and replace the old school which is now a community centre.

== Parish church ==
The massive Norman tower of St Petroc's Church (now at the west end) was apparently the central tower of a cruciform building. The west portion of the church was demolished, perhaps in the early 14th century, when the existing nave was rebuilt with two transepts. In the early 15th century these transepts were enlarged into aisles. The fine font of red sandstone is late 12th century and is similar in style to others in neighbouring churches.

On the south of the churchyard is the manor house, part of which is 15th century.

In 1436 the vicar, the Rev John Hay, was dragged out of the church and murdered while officiating at divine service. The door through which he was taken has been walled up, though the old doorway is just visible.

== Transport ==
South Brent is next to the Devon Expressway which connects Exeter 32 mi (51 km) to the north-east and Plymouth 18 mi (29 km) to the west.

Brent railway station was opened on the South Devon Railway on 15 June 1848. It served as the junction for the branch line to Kingsbridge from 19 December 1893. The station closed in 1964, though for some years there has been a movement to reopen it in order to reduce commuter traffic on the roads. The nearest railway station is Ivybridge railway station, which is 4.5 miles away.

== Sport and leisure ==
The Palstone Park recreation ground is the home of the South Brent Football Club. It was founded as South Brent United in 1931. It is also the home of South Brent Judo Club formed in April 1974.

Locals complain that South Brent experiences higher rainfall than surrounding towns and villages. It seems likely that the hills of Dartmoor do affect the microclimate of South Brent.

== Notable former residents ==
William Crossing (1847–1928), Dartmoor historian

== Sources ==
- Wall, Greg (2005) The book of South Brent, Halsgrove
