= Kingsbridge =

Market town in the South Hams district of Devon, England

Coordinates: 50.2833°N 3.7765°W

- Kingsbridge Town Hall and St Edmund's Church

- Coat of Arms

- Location within Devon
- Population: 5,683 (2021 Census)
- OS grid reference: SX7344
- Civil parish: Kingsbridge
- District: South Hams
- Shire county: Devon
- Region: South West
- Country: England
- Sovereign state: United Kingdom
- Post town: KINGSBRIDGE
- Postcode district: TQ7
- Dialling code: 01548
- Police: Devon and Cornwall
- Fire: Devon and Somerset
- Ambulance: South Western
- UK Parliament: South Devon

Kingsbridge is a market town in the South Hams district of Devon, England. It is the third largest settlement in the South Hams and is 17 miles (27 km) southwest of Torquay, 17 miles (27 km) southeast of Plymouth, and 32 miles (51 km) of Exeter. It had a population of 5,683 at the 2021 census.

Kingsbridge is situated at the northern end of the Kingsbridge Estuary, a ria that extends to the sea six miles (10 km) south of the town.

== History ==
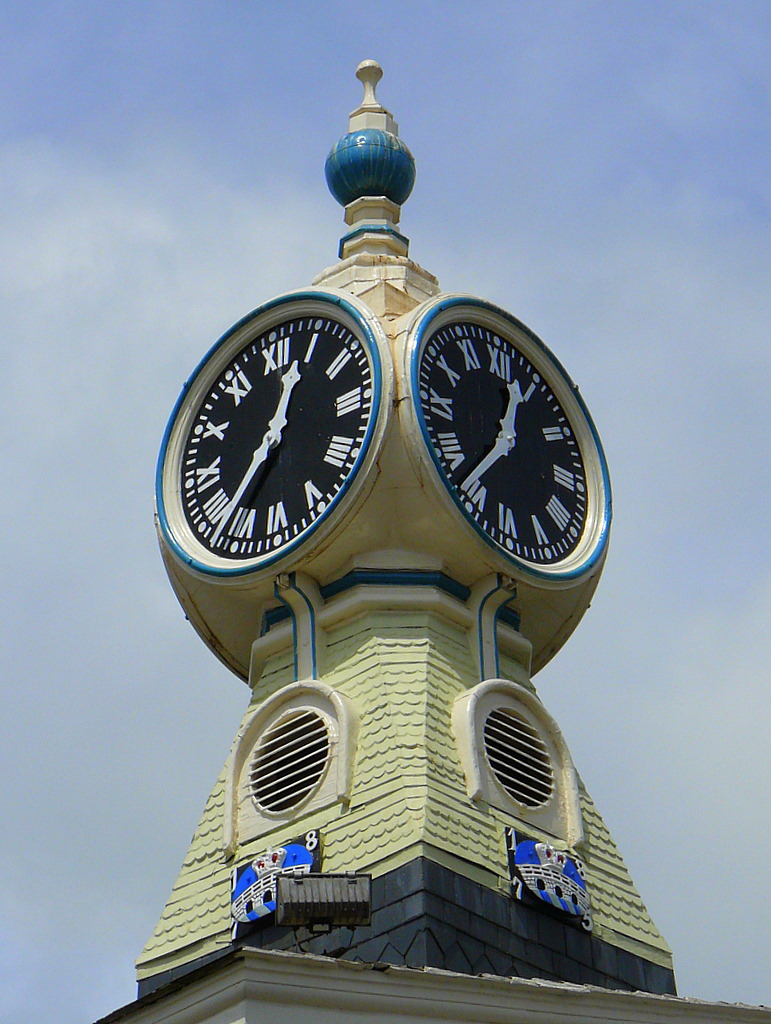
Clock on the old Kingsbridge Town Hall building

The town formed around a bridge which was built in or before the 10th century between the royal estates of Alvington, to the west, and Chillington, to the east, hence giving it the name of Kyngysbrygge ("King's bridge"). In 1219 the Abbot of Buckfast was granted the right to hold a market there, and by 1238 the settlement had become a borough. The manor remained in possession of the abbot until the Dissolution of the Monasteries, when it was granted to Sir William Petre. Kingsbridge was never represented in Parliament or incorporated by charter, the local government being by a portreeve. It lay within the hundred of Stanborough.

Kingsbridge is, in fact, a combination of two towns, Kingsbridge and Dodbrooke. Dodbrooke was granted its own market in 1257 and had become a borough by 1319. While Dodbrooke was originally considered to be the dominant of the two, Kingsbridge later expanded to include it. The town consists of two ecclesiastical parishes: St. Edmund's in the west and St. Thomas Becket at Dodbrooke in the east. St. Edmund's Church, in mainly Perpendicular style, retains some 13th-century features including a font, but was enlarged and reconsecrated around 1414 and was mostly rebuilt in the 19th century. The parish church of St. Thomas Becket displays a particularly well-preserved rood screen, restored in 1897.

A map of the town was drawn up in 1586 recording land belonging to Sir John Petre.

In 1798 the town mills were converted into a woollen manufactory, which produced large quantities of cloth, and serge manufacture was introduced early in the 19th century. During the 19th century the town had an active coastal shipping trade, shipbuilding, a tannery, other industries and a large monthly cattle market. The chief exports were cider, corn, malt, and slate.

Kingsbridge was used by Anthony Trollope as the setting for his novel Rachel Ray (1863) and by Rachel Joyce as the setting for her 2012 novel The Unlikely Pilgrimage of Harold Fry. In October 2021 Embankment Films started filming in Kingsbridge for the big screen version of The Unlikely Pilgrimage of Harold Fry, starring Jim Broadbent, Penelope Wilton, Monika Gossmann and Bethan Cullinane. The film was released in April 2023.

The town centre retains many 18th- and 19th-century buildings. The Shambles, or market arcade, was rebuilt in 1796 but retains its 16th-century granite piers. The former grammar school, now the Kingsbridge Cookworthy Museum, was founded and built by Thomas Crispin in 1670.

== Modern day ==
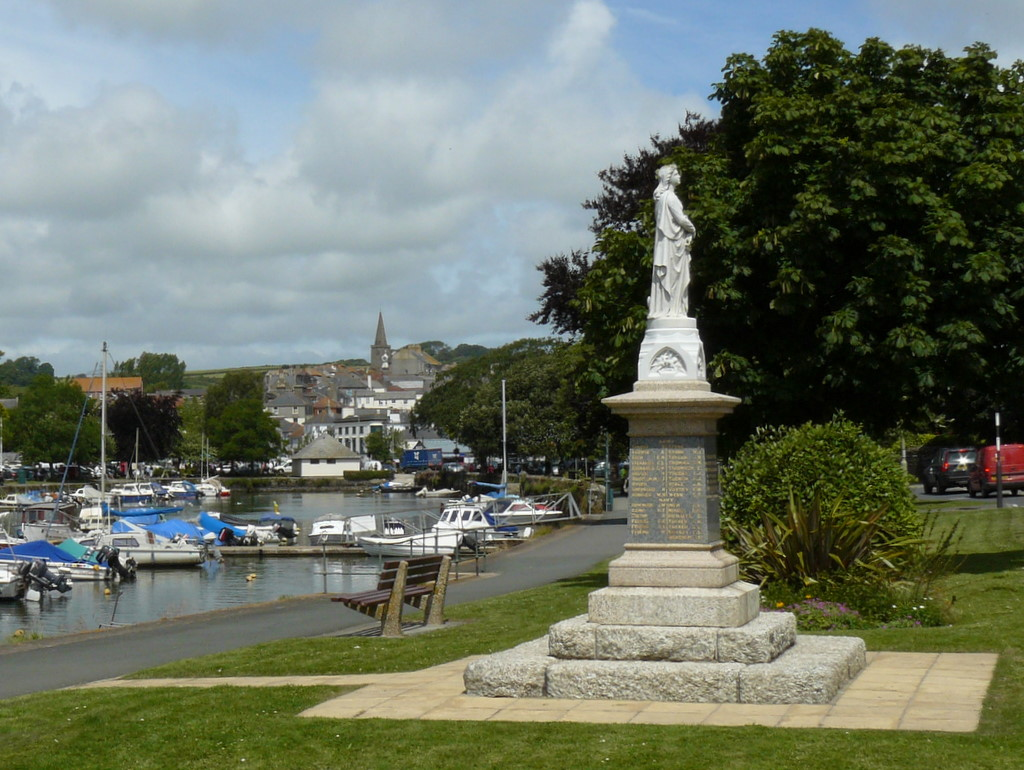
View of the town over the estuary

Kingsbridge has been the main market town in the area for centuries. Being situated within the South Devon Area of Outstanding Natural Beauty (AONB) and with its proximity to the south Devon coast and sailing venues such as Salcombe and Hope Cove, the town has developed into a popular tourist destination. Its attractions include several restaurants, pubs, a cinema housed in the old Kingsbridge Town Hall building, and a museum devoted to the chemist William Cookworthy who was born in the town in 1705.

There are two supermarkets in Kingsbridge: a Morrisons and a Tesco Store, which opened in 2010. It also has a large secondary school, Kingsbridge Community College, which has over 1,000 pupils and serves the surrounding area. Kingsbridge was home to "the only nightclub in the South Hams", Coast (which has since closed), with the next nearest club being in Torquay.

The town is linked to Plymouth and Dartmouth by the A379 road, and to Salcombe and Totnes by the A381. For seventy years it had a railway station until the branch line, via South Brent, was closed in 1963 as part of the Beeching cuts. An industrial estate now occupies the site of the former station yard, but a railway bridge and a short section of overgrown embankment can still be seen.

Kingsbridge has its own Parish Council with an elected Town Mayor.

On the eastern promenade of the estuary and port, there is a miniature railway. The track has a length of about 300 metres and a gauge of 7 1/4 inches (184mm). Primarily run on another site in the 1970s and 1980s, it was relaunched with the modern track on the actual site in 2015 by the tourist information center. It is rather a public toy, run by volunteers. Each carriage of the train consists of a longitudinal bench. The size is dimensioned for children, but also adults are able to sit on it. The electric power for the engine is received from solar modules.

== Twin town ==
Kingsbridge is twinned with

- Weilerbach, Kaiserslautern, Germany

A twinning arrangement with Isigny-sur-Mer in Normandy, France, ended in 2019 after 58 years.

== Cultural associations ==
A song titled "Farewell to Kingsbridge" was collected by Sabine Baring-Gould at Lydford, Devon. It belongs to the years 1778–80 when soldiers stationed here had to depart for North America.

== Notable residents ==
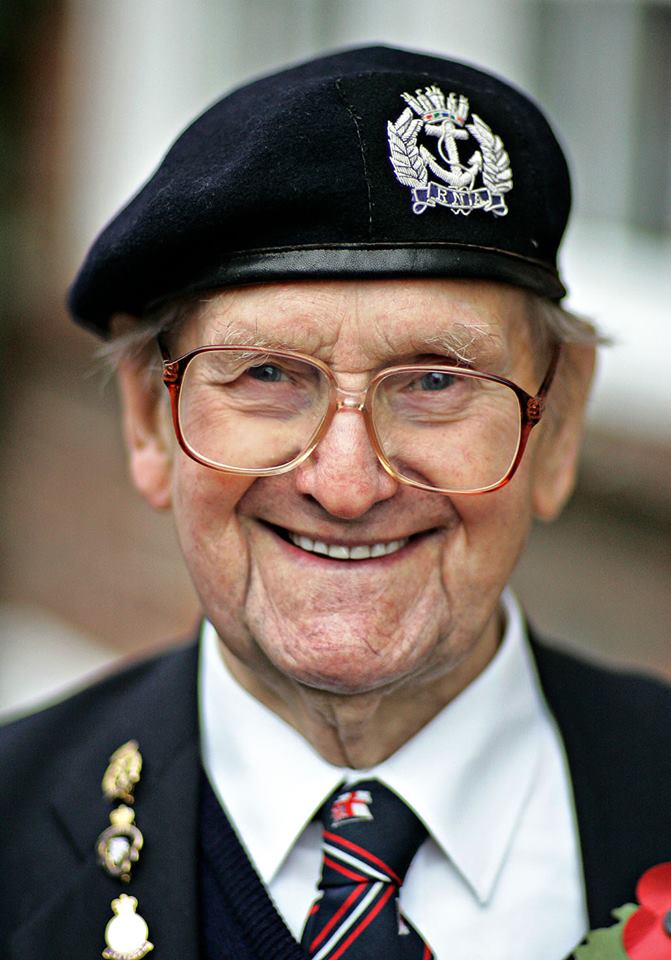
William Stone, 2006

- William Cookworthy (1705–1780), discovered English china clay and produced the first English porcelain.
- John Wolcot (1738–1819), poet and satirist who wrote as "Peter Pindar", was born here.
- John Cranch (1751–1821), painter of portraits and historical pictures.
- George Montagu (1753–1815), naturalist, eponym for Montagu's harrier, lived and died locally.
- John Scoble (1799–1877), anti-slavery campaigner in Britain and Canada, was born in Kingsbridge.
- Sir Courtenay Ilbert (1841–1924), distinguished lawyer and civil servant, he became Clerk of the House of Commons from 1902 to 1921.
- William Henry Squire (1871–1963), cellist, composer and music professor, educated locally.
- Vincent Harris (1876–1971), architect, was educated in the town.
- Robert Borlase Smart (1881–1947), an art editor, critic, artist and founding member of the St Ives School
- William Stone (1900–2009), Last Royal Navy Veteran of the Great War living in the United Kingdom.
- Maurice Fox-Strangways, 9th Earl of Ilchester (1920–2006), RAF officer and nuclear weapons engineer, was educated here.
- Sir William Mitchell (1925–2002), physicist, professor of physics and helped pioneer the field of neutron scattering.

=== Sport ===
- Peter Wakeham (1936–2013), a football goalkeeper who played over 280 games beginning with 58 for Torquay United
- Gary Kingdom (born 1982), rugby union player who has played over 400 games including 245 for Taunton Titans.
- Mark Ellis (born 1988), footballer who played over 500 games, including 120 for Torquay United
- Giselle Ansley (born 1992), England and Great Britain hockey player, team gold medallist at the 2016 Summer Olympics

== See also ==
- South Hams Hospital
