= Grade I listed buildings in South Hams =

There are over 9,000 Grade I listed buildings in England. This page is a list of these buildings in the district of South Hams in Devon.

== South Hams ==
Name	Location	Type	Completed (Note: The date given is the date used by Historic England as significant for the initial building or that of an important part in the structure's description.)	Date designated	Grid ref. (Note: The grid reference is based on the British national grid reference system, sometimes known as OSGB36, used by the Ordnance Survey.) Geo-coordinates	Entry number (Note: The "List Entry Number" is a unique number assigned to each listed building and scheduled monument by Historic England.)	Image
Church of St David	Ashprington, South Hams	Parish Church	13th century or 14th century	9 February 1961	SX8185557151; 50°24′08″N 3°39′50″W	1108393	Church of St David More images
Sharpham House	Ashprington, South Hams	Villa	c. 1770	11 November 1952	SX8270157870; 50°24′32″N 3°39′08″W	1108385	Sharpham House More images
Berry Pomeroy Castle	Berry Pomeroy, South Hams	Castle	c. 1300	9 February 1961	SX8390362297; 50°26′56″N 3°38′12″W	1108571	Berry Pomeroy Castle More images
Church of St Mary	Berry Pomeroy, South Hams	Church	15th century	9 February 1961	SX8289260999; 50°26′14″N 3°39′01″W	1108535	Church of St Mary More images
Church of St Mary	Bickleigh, South Hams	Parish Church	15th century	29 March 1960	SX5208762310; 50°26′31″N 4°05′04″W	1107473	Church of St Mary More images
Church of St Michael	Blackawton, South Hams	Parish Church	14th century	26 January 1967	SX8047350951; 50°20′47″N 3°40′53″W	1108023	Church of St Michael More images
Church of St Mary	Brixton, South Hams	Parish Church	circa 13th century	29 March 1960	SX5538752197; 50°21′07″N 4°02′03″W	1325213	Church of St Mary More images
Higher Hareston	Brixton, South Hams	Hall House	circa late 15th century early 16th century	29 March 1984	SX5660353433; 50°21′48″N 4°01′03″W	1107828	Upload Photo
Gatehouse to Leigh Barton Farm	Leigh, Churchstow, South Hams	Boundary Wall	15th century	28 July 1989	SX7202646727; 50°18′24″N 3°47′55″W	1168488	Upload Photo
Leigh Barton Farmhouse	Leigh, Churchstow, South Hams	Kitchen	15th century	28 July 1989	SX7202446699; 50°18′23″N 3°47′55″W	1108145	Upload Photo
Church of St Michael	Cornwood, South Hams	Parish Church	c. 1300	29 March 1960	SX6043159365; 50°25′03″N 3°57′57″W	1107445	Church of St Michael More images
Fardel Manor House Including Walls to North West and South West	Fardel, Cornwood, South Hams	Cross Wing House	Circa 15th century	23 April 1982	SX6121457431; 50°24′01″N 3°57′15″W	1162392	Upload Photo
Church of St Peter	Cornworthy, South Hams	Parish Church	by 1878	9 February 1961	SX8294855547; 50°23′17″N 3°38′52″W	1291647	Church of St Peter More images
Priory Gatehouse	Cornworthy, South Hams	Augustinian Nunnery	founded 1205-1238	9 February 1961	SX8217555606; 50°23′19″N 3°39′32″W	1291588	Priory Gatehouse More images
Dartington Hall	Dartington, South Hams	Country House	1388-1399	11 November 1952	SX7982062668; 50°27′05″N 3°41′39″W	1108353	Dartington Hall More images
Tower of Former Church of St Mary Immediately West of Dartington Hall	Dartington Hall, Dartington, South Hams	Tower	1993	9 February 1961	SX7978062694; 50°27′06″N 3°41′41″W	1219690	Tower of Former Church of St Mary Immediately West of Dartington Hall More images
Bearscove Castle	Dartmouth, South Hams	Artillery Castle	by 1537	14 September 1949	SX8786550965; 50°20′52″N 3°34′39″W	1208168	Bearscove Castle More images
Church of St Clement	Townstal, Dartmouth, South Hams	Parish Church	Early 14th century	14 September 1949	SX8693751473; 50°21′08″N 3°35′26″W	1208447	Church of St Clement More images
Dartmouth Castle and gun platforms to west and south	Dartmouth Castle, Dartmouth, South Hams	Tower	1480-1494	11 December 1969	SX8867050332; 50°20′32″N 3°33′57″W	1197563	Dartmouth Castle and gun platforms to west and south More images
Church of St Petrox	Dartmouth Castle, Dartmouth, South Hams	Church	12th century	14 September 1949	SX8865750310; 50°20′32″N 3°33′58″W	1297086	Church of St Petrox More images
Church of St Saviour	Dartmouth, South Hams	Church	earlier in the 14th century	14 September 1949	SX8776451329; 50°21′04″N 3°34′44″W	1293197	Church of St Saviour More images
No. 6, The Butterwalk, Duke St	Dartmouth, South Hams	Apartment	1949	14 September 1949	SX8778851411; 50°21′07″N 3°34′43″W	1197516	No. 6, The Butterwalk, Duke St More images
No. 8, The Butterwalk, Duke St	Dartmouth, South Hams	Apartment	1949	14 September 1949	SX8778351408; 50°21′07″N 3°34′43″W	1197517	No. 8, The Butterwalk, Duke St More images
No. 10, The Butterwalk, Duke St	Dartmouth, South Hams	Apartment	1949	14 September 1949	SX8777551407; 50°21′07″N 3°34′44″W	1197518	No. 10, The Butterwalk, Duke St More images
No. 12, The Butterwalk, Duke St	Dartmouth, South Hams	Apartment	1949	14 September 1949	SX8776951406; 50°21′07″N 3°34′44″W	1197519	No. 12, The Butterwalk, Duke St More images
Walls of the Ruined Fortalice	Dartmouth Castle, Dartmouth, South Hams	Tower	Late 14th century	11 December 1969	SX8863050277; 50°20′31″N 3°33′59″W	1197566	Walls of the Ruined Fortalice More images
Church of St George	Dean Prior, South Hams	Parish Church	Circa 13th century or early 14th century	9 February 1961	SX7302163543; 50°27′29″N 3°47′25″W	1308741	Church of St George More images
Church of St Mary	Diptford, South Hams	Parish Church	13th century	9 February 1961	SX7273656768; 50°23′49″N 3°47′31″W	1211482	Church of St Mary More images
Church of St George	Dittisham, South Hams	Parish Church	originally 1050	9 February 1961	SX8611755073; 50°23′04″N 3°36′12″W	1108270	Church of St George More images
Church of St Peter and St Paul	Ermington, South Hams	Church	15th century	29 March 1960	SX6383553219; 50°21′47″N 3°54′57″W	1308362	Church of St Peter and St Paul More images
Church of St Martin	Sherford, Frogmore and Sherford, South Hams	Parish Church	14th century	26 January 1967	SX7789944246; 50°17′08″N 3°42′55″W	1169223	Church of St Martin More images
Church of All Saints including Fishacre Tomb adjoining Transept (formerly listed under Parish of Moreleigh)	Moreleigh, Halwell and Moreleigh, South Hams	Church	13th century	9 February 1961	SX7612752585; 50°21′36″N 3°44′34″W	1108278	Church of All Saints including Fishacre Tomb adjoining Transept (formerly listed under Parish of Moreleigh) More images
Church of St Leonard	Halwell, Halwell and Moreleigh, South Hams	Parish Church	possibly after 1288	9 February 1961	SX7773353204; 50°21′58″N 3°43′14″W	1108275	Church of St Leonard More images
Church of St Andrew	Harberton, South Hams	Church	12th century site of	9 February 1961	SX7782958637; 50°24′53″N 3°43′15″W	1108222	Church of St Andrew More images
Church of St Petroc	Harford, South Hams	Parish Church	Circa late 15th century to early 16th century	23 March 1960	SX6383159471; 50°25′09″N 3°55′05″W	1162617	Church of St Petroc More images
Church of All Saints	Holbeton, South Hams	Church	Late 19th century	29 March 1960	SX6130050183; 50°20′07″N 3°57′01″W	1107808	Church of All Saints More images
Flete	Holbeton, South Hams	Country House	16th century	29 March 1960	SX6278251382; 50°20′47″N 3°55′48″W	1107820	Flete More images
Gate Piers, Gates, Walls and Terraces Immediately North and East of Flete	Holbeton, South Hams	Terrace	1878	19 July 1984	SX6280451417; 50°20′48″N 3°55′47″W	1107777	Upload Photo
Mothecombe House	Mothecombe, Holbeton, South Hams	Country House	c. 1710	29 March 1960	SX6086047813; 50°18′50″N 3°57′20″W	1168279	Mothecombe House More images
Church of St Mary the Virgin	Holne, South Hams	Parish Church	c. 1300	9 February 1961	SX7058069488; 50°30′39″N 3°49′36″W	1107379	Church of St Mary the Virgin More images
Church of St Edmund	Kingsbridge, South Hams	Church	1414	13 December 1949	SX7341444401; 50°17′09″N 3°46′42″W	1165559	Church of St Edmund More images
Church of St Thomas a Becket	Dodbrooke, Kingsbridge, South Hams	Church	15th century	13 December 1949	SX7393644518; 50°17′14″N 3°46′15″W	1317351	Church of St Thomas a Becket More images
Kingswear Castle	Kingswear, South Hams	Castle	By mid 17th century abandoned	8 October 1949	SX8910150282; 50°20′31″N 3°33′35″W	1108543	Kingswear Castle More images
Church of St John the Baptist	Littlehempston, South Hams	Church	14th century	9 February 1961	SX8124562633; 50°27′05″N 3°40′27″W	1108513	Church of St John the Baptist More images
The Old Manor Including Barn Adjoining South and Courtyard Walls Attached to South East	Littlehempston, South Hams	House	1952	11 February 1952	SX8079763280; 50°27′26″N 3°40′50″W	1108511	The Old Manor Including Barn Adjoining South and Courtyard Walls Attached to South East More images
Church of All Saints	Malborough, South Hams	Parish Church	13th century	26 January 1967	SX7068539815; 50°14′39″N 3°48′54″W	1108485	Church of All Saints More images
Yarde Farmhouse	Malborough, South Hams	Farmhouse	Second half of the 17th century	26 January 1967	SX7167940056; 50°14′47″N 3°48′04″W	1108479	Upload Photo
Church of St John the Baptist	Marldon, South Hams	Parish Church	c. 1400	9 February 1961	SX8662463576; 50°27′40″N 3°35′55″W	1308643	Church of St John the Baptist More images
Compton Castle	Compton, Marldon, South Hams	Castle	Early 14th century	11 November 1952	SX8653764839; 50°28′20″N 3°36′01″W	1324886	Compton Castle More images
Church of St George	Modbury, South Hams	Anglican Church	1621	26 January 1967	SX6559951549; 50°20′55″N 3°53′25″W	1108059	Church of St George More images
Church of Holy Cross	Newton Ferrers, Newton and Noss, South Hams	Parish Church	C13/14	29 March 1960	SX5501548153; 50°18′56″N 4°02′16″W	1325256	Church of Holy Cross More images
Church of St Peter the Poor Fisherman	Revelstoke, Newton and Noss, South Hams	Church	circa 13th century	19 July 1984	SX5639446437; 50°18′01″N 4°01′04″W	1107794	Church of St Peter the Poor Fisherman More images
Puslinch House	Puslinch, Newton and Noss, South Hams	Country House	c. 1720	29 March 1960	SX5695050893; 50°20′26″N 4°00′42″W	1168866	Puslinch House More images
Church of St Mary	North Huish, South Hams	Church	14th century	9 February 1961	SX7113056548; 50°23′41″N 3°48′52″W	1108208	Church of St Mary More images
Church of St Mary	Rattery, South Hams	Parish Church	13th century	9 February 1961	SX7407061551; 50°26′25″N 3°46′29″W	1147626	Church of St Mary More images
Church of St Edward	Shaugh Prior, South Hams	Parish Church	15th century	29 March 1960	SX5428063112; 50°26′59″N 4°03′14″W	1162816	Church of St Edward More images
Church of St James	Slapton, South Hams	Parish Church	13th century	26 January 1967	SX8213144990; 50°17′35″N 3°39′22″W	1164002	Church of St James More images
Tower of Collegiate Chantry of St Mary	Slapton, South Hams	Bell Tower	1372 OR 3	26 January 1967	SX8216345061; 50°17′37″N 3°39′20″W	1317950	Tower of Collegiate Chantry of St Mary More images
Church of St Petrock	South Brent, South Hams	Parish Church	Circa 12th century	9 February 1961	SX6961960257; 50°25′40″N 3°50′13″W	1147794	Church of St Petrock More images
Church of All Saints	South Milton, South Hams	Parish Church	12th century	26 January 1967	SX6980142898; 50°16′18″N 3°49′42″W	1108433	Church of All Saints More images
Church of St Nicholas and St Cyriac	South Pool, South Hams	Parish Church	Early 14th century	26 January 1967	SX7763140377; 50°15′02″N 3°43′04″W	1324926	Church of St Nicholas and St Cyriac More images
Old Newnham	Sparkwell, South Hams	Manor House	15th century	23 April 1952	SX5521257331; 50°23′53″N 4°02′19″W	1162879	Old Newnham More images
Church of St Paul	Staverton, South Hams	Parish Church	circa early 14th century	9 February 1961	SX7938463909; 50°27′45″N 3°42′03″W	1108524	Church of St Paul More images
Staverton Bridge	Staverton, South Hams	Road Bridge	1413	9 February 1961	SX7846363724; 50°27′39″N 3°42′49″W	1324890	Staverton Bridge More images
Staverton Bridge	Staverton, South Hams	Road Bridge	1413	9 February 1961	SX7846863720; 50°27′38″N 3°42′49″W	1324955	Staverton Bridge More images
Church of St Gabriel and St Mary	Stoke Gabriel, South Hams	Parish Church	13th century	9 February 1961	SX8491657135; 50°24′10″N 3°37′15″W	1108497	Church of St Gabriel and St Mary More images
Church of St Michael	Stokenham, South Hams	Parish Church	14th century	26 January 1967	SX8083942828; 50°16′24″N 3°40′25″W	1107972	Church of St Michael More images
Bowden House	Ashprington, near Totnes, South Hams	Manor House	c. 1509	7 January 1952	SX8014358848; 50°25′02″N 3°41′18″W	1236034	Bowden House More images
Church of St Mary	Totnes, South Hams	Church	before 1432	7 January 1952	SX8021960473; 50°25′55″N 3°41′16″W	1236065	Church of St Mary More images
Eastgate (part of No 2 High Street)	Totnes, South Hams	Gate	14th century	7 January 1952	SX8027660426; 50°25′53″N 3°41′13″W	1236272	Eastgate (part of No 2 High Street) More images
Elizabethan House and Local Museum	Totnes, South Hams	Kitchen	late 16th century or early 17th century	7 January 1952	SX8030460410; 50°25′53″N 3°41′12″W	1235946	Elizabethan House and Local Museum More images
Totnes Castle	Totnes, South Hams	Motte and Bailey	shortly after Conquest	14 November 1969	SX8002760505; 50°25′56″N 3°41′26″W	1168856	Totnes Castle More images
Totnes Guildhall	Totnes, South Hams	Guildhall	c. 1553	7 January 1952	SX8022660502; 50°25′56″N 3°41′16″W	1235949	Totnes Guildhall More images
43 Butterwalk and 43 High Street	Totnes, South Hams	House	14th century or early 15th century	7 January 1952	SX8011360462; 50°25′54″N 3°41′22″W	1264728	43 Butterwalk and 43 High Street More images
Church of St Peter	Ugborough, South Hams	Parish Church	Early 14th century	9 February 1961	SX6774855719; 50°23′11″N 3°51′42″W	1168309	Church of St Peter More images
Church of St Werburgh	Wembury, South Hams	Parish Church	14th century	29 March 1960	SX5184448501; 50°19′04″N 4°04′57″W	1169151	Church of St Werburgh More images
Bowringsleigh	West Alvington, South Hams	Country House	15th century	25 October 1951	SX7176944422; 50°17′09″N 3°48′05″W	1170092	Upload Photo
Church of All Saints	West Alvington, South Hams	Parish Church	13th century	26 January 1967	SX7239143876; 50°16′52″N 3°47′33″W	1108423	Church of All Saints More images
Kitley House	Yealmpton, South Hams	Country House	1710	23 April 1952	SX5596951462; 50°20′43″N 4°01′32″W	1306538	Kitley House More images
Lyneham House	Lyneham, Yealmpton, South Hams	Country House	circa 1699 to 1703	23 April 1952	SX5788053454; 50°21′50″N 3°59′58″W	1169295	Lyneham House More images
