= William Stumbels =

English 18th century clockmaker

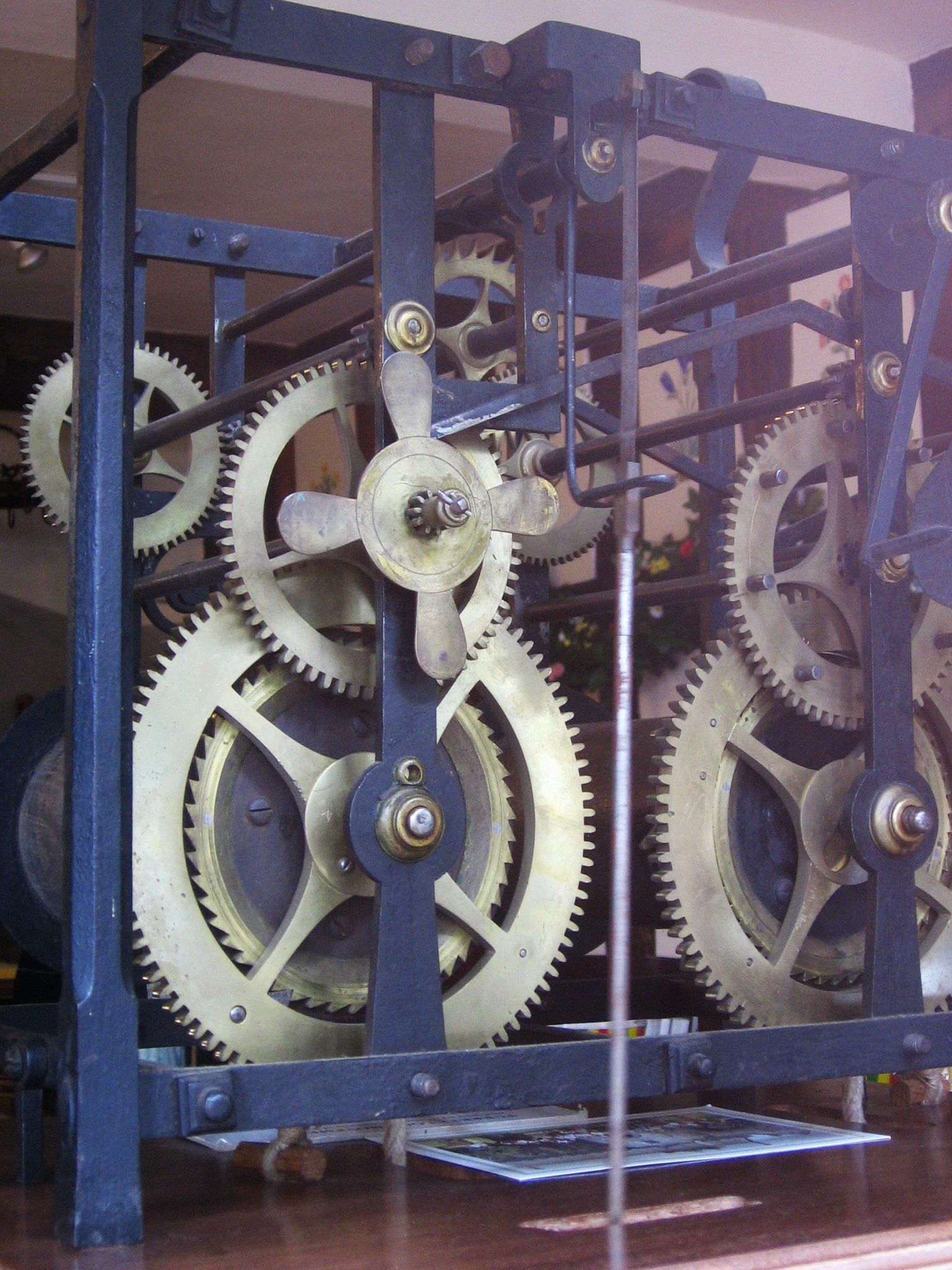
William Stumbels' turret clock mechanism in Totnes Museum.

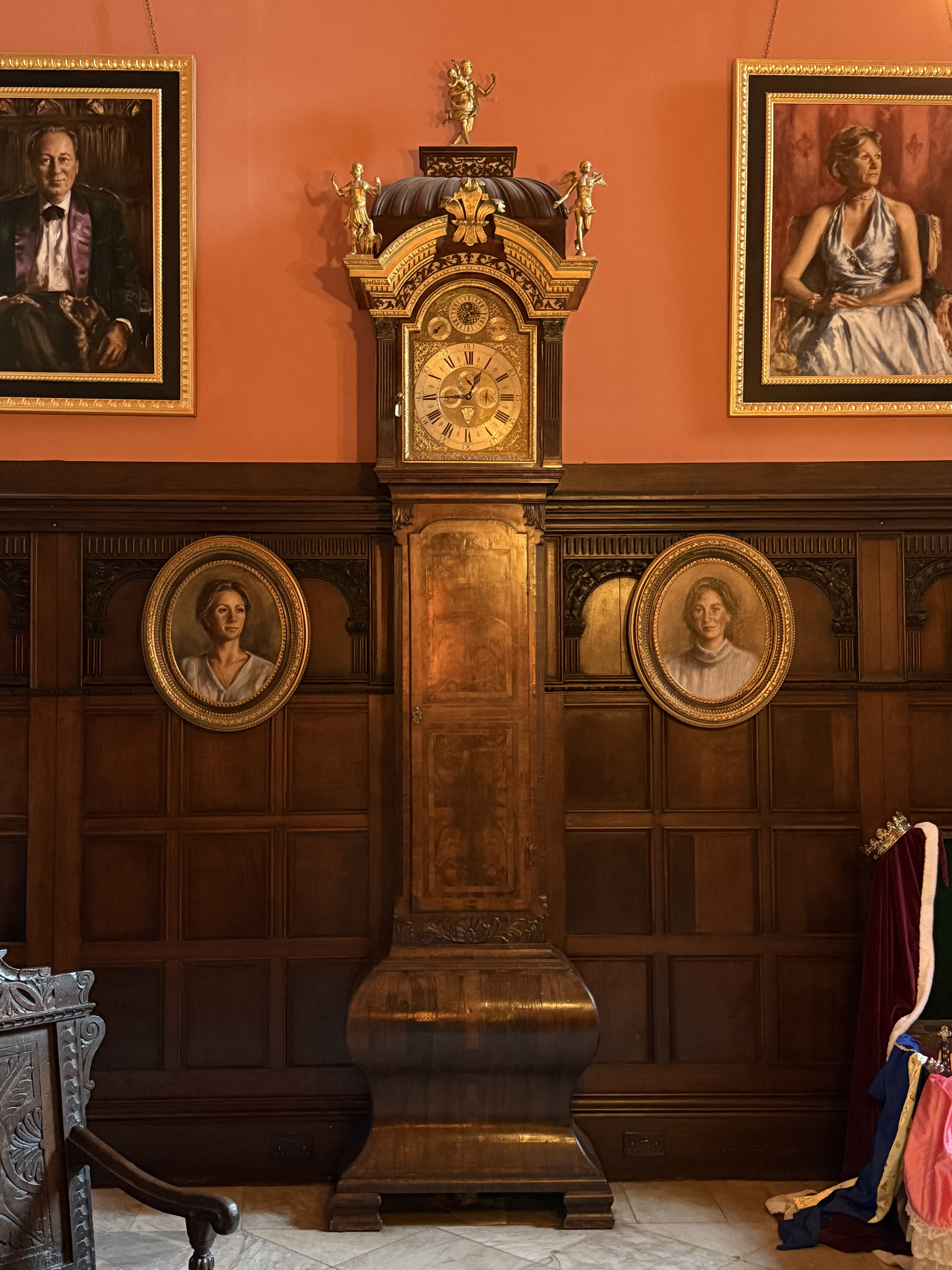
Clock by William Stumbles in Powderham Castle

William Stumbels lived and worked as a clockmaker in Totnes, Devon, from around 1700 to 1769. Two of his clocks can be found in Totnes Museum. A 14-foot high longcase clock made by him between 1743 and 1747, for which he charged £105, can be seen in the Marble Hall of Powderham Castle.
