= Totnes Castle =

Norman motte and bailey castle in Devon, England

- Devon, England
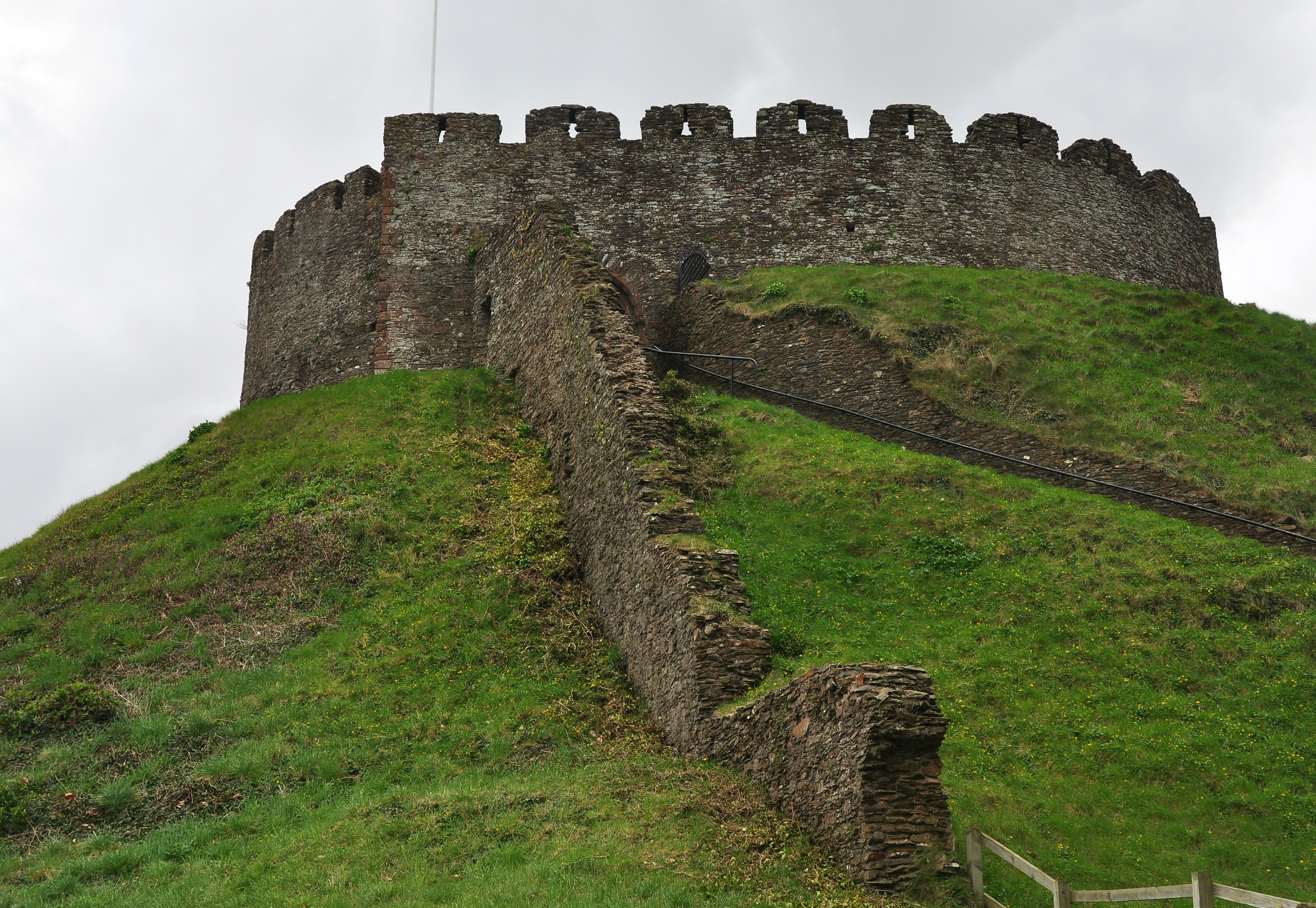
- Keep of Totnes Castle

Site information
- Type: Shell keep on motte-and-bailey
- Owner: English Heritage
- Open to the public: Yes

Location
- Shown within Devon
- Location within Devon
- Coordinates: 50.4321°N 3.6910°W
- Grid reference: grid reference SX800605

Site history
- Materials: Devonian limestone and red sandstone

Totnes Castle is one of the best preserved examples of a Norman motte and bailey castle in England. It is situated in the town of Totnes on the River Dart in Devon. The surviving stone keep and curtain wall date from around the 14th century. From after the Norman Conquest of 1066 it was the caput of the Feudal barony of Totnes.

== History ==
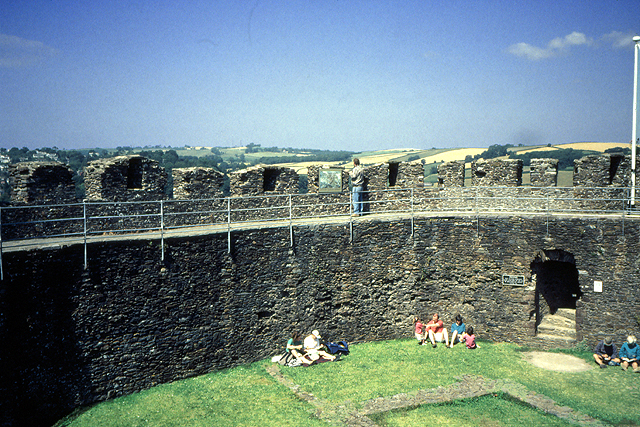
Internal view of the castle ramparts.

The castle occupies a commanding position atop a large hill above the town, and guards the approach to three valleys.

The first castle on this site is believed to have been built by the Breton Juhel of Totnes (also known as Judhael) who was one of William the Conqueror's lieutenants. The feudal barony of Totnes was granted to him in 1068, and in order to cement his control over the area he constructed a fortification and founded Totnes Priory within the town. This first construction probably consisted of a wooden palisade and tower. On the death of King William I, Juhel lost his lands, possibly as a result of his support for the Rebellion of 1088. The feudal barony of Totnes was then granted to Roger de Nonant, whose descendants appear to have held it for the next three generations. Following this it came into the possession of William de Braose, 3rd Lord of Bramber, who is probably responsible for constructing the first stone shell keep and walls on the site.

By 1326, the castle had fallen into ruin and was under the control the de la Zouch family. During this period a royal order was made for the repair of the fortifications. As a result, the castle was re-fortified with a new shell keep, using Devonian limestone and red sandstone, a stable was constructed and a constable appointed. Following the Wars of the Roses it once again fell into disrepair. The castle was occupied for a period during the Civil War but saw no notable action.

== Occupants of the Castle ==
Totnes Castle has a history spanning several centuries. It all began in 1067 when Juhel, a Norman Knight, constructed and inhabited the castle. Sixteen years later, in 1083, Roger de Nonant seized control of the castle. The year 1205 saw William de Braose, the 4th Lord of Bramber and a descendant of Juhel, reclaim the castle, although it is unlikely that he resided there. Instead, it was his son, Reginald de Braose, who likely erected the first stone castle on the site. Subsequently, in 1326, the de la Zouch clan assumed ownership of the castle and undertook extensive rebuilding, transforming its structure. Fast forward to 1485, when Sir Richard Edgecomb became the new owner of Totnes Castle. Finally, in 1764, Edward Seymour, the 9th Duke of Somerset, and his family took up residence at the castle. During their tenure, they introduced leisure facilities like a tennis court and a tea room.

== Preservation ==
Since 1984 the castle has been under the stewardship of English Heritage. The castle is a scheduled monument and a Grade I listed building.

== See also ==
- Castles in Great Britain and Ireland
- List of castles in England
- Grade I listed buildings in Devon
- Totnes Guildhall
- Totnes Museum
