= Bayard's Cove Fort =

English 16th-century artillery blockhouse

- Dartmouth, Devon
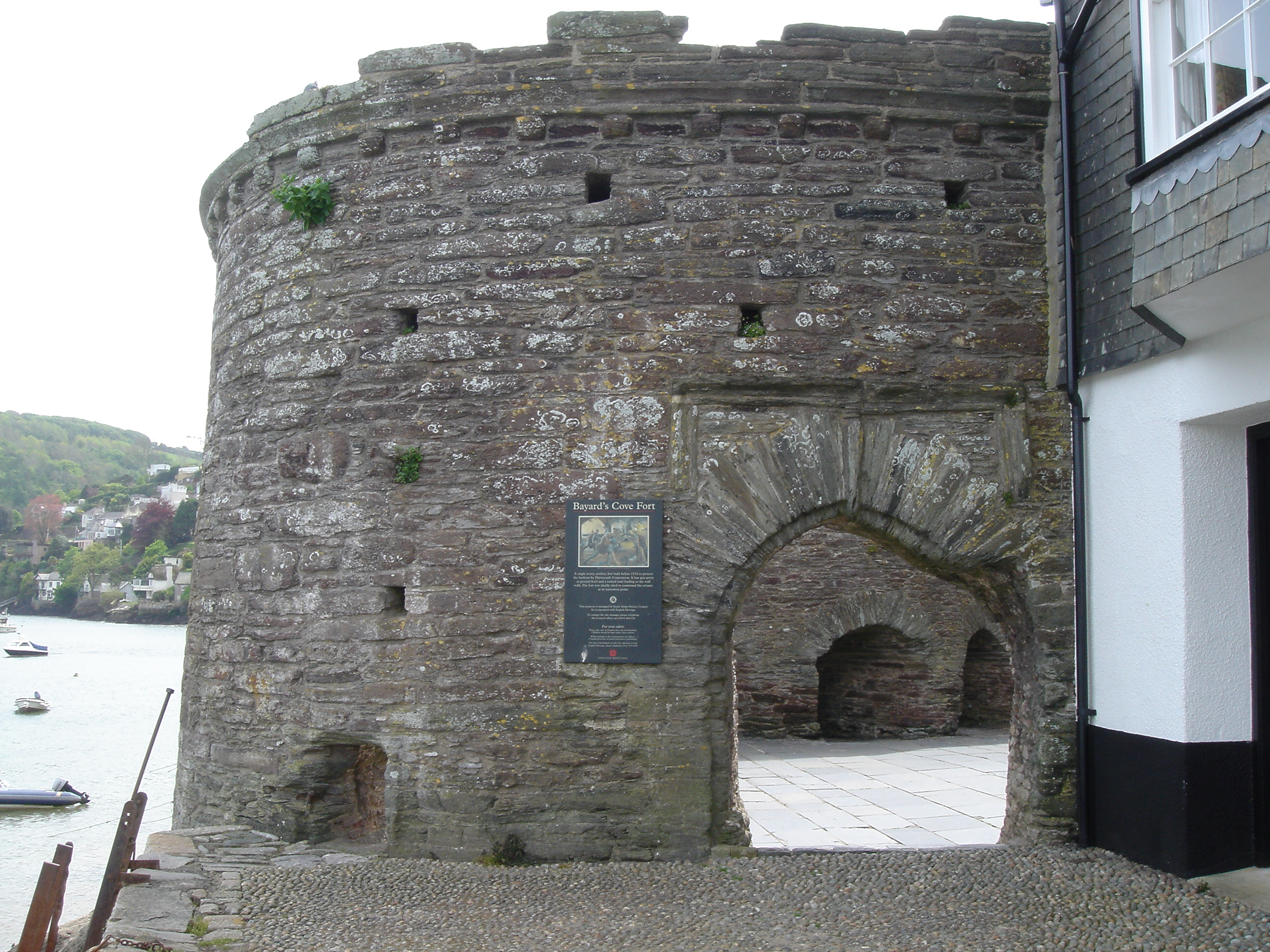
- The fort entrance, viewed from the quay

Site information
- Type: Artillery fort
- Owner: English Heritage
- Open to the public: Yes
- Condition: Ruined

Location
- Bayard's Cove Fort, shown within Kent
- Coordinates: 50.34789°N 3.57749°W

Site history
- Materials: Limestone
- Events: English Civil War, Second World War

Scheduled monument
- Official name: Bayard's Cove Castle
- Designated: 28 November 1934
- Reference no.: 1014668

Listed Building – Grade I
- Official name: Bearscove Castle
- Designated: 14 September 1949
- Reference no.: 1208168

Bayard's Cove Fort, also known historically as Berescove or Bearscore Castle, is an English 16th-century artillery blockhouse, built to defend the harbour entrance at Dartmouth in Devon. Constructed in the early part of the century, it had eleven gunports for heavy artillery and was intended to engage enemy vessels that broke past the external defences of the Dartmouth and Kingswear castles. It remained armed during the English Civil War, but was neglected in the 18th century and used for storage. The fort was restored in the late 19th century and is now managed by English Heritage and open to visitors.

== History ==
=== 16th century ===
Bayard's Cove Fort was built in the early 16th century to protect the coastal town of Dartmouth in Devon. In the medieval period, the town's harbour, located in the estuary of the River Dart, was an important trading and fishing port, able to hold up to 600 vessels; it continued to prosper in the 15th century on the proceeds of the wool trade. Fears of a French invasion, combined with the hope of retaining a valuable royal subsidy, led the town to develop Dartmouth Castle, on the west side of the estuary, into an artillery fort after 1486, with another fortification, Kingswear, being constructed the east side from 1491 onwards.

It is uncertain precisely when Bayard's Cove Fort was built: historians suggest that it was either started in 1509–10 at the beginning of Henry VIII's reign, following a royal instruction to the water bailiff of Dartmouth, or in 1529 by the town in response to fears of a French and Spanish attack. The fort was certainly complete by 1537; Thomas Howard, the Earl of Surrey, may have been referring to it in 1522, when he reported the "blockhouse of stone" in Dartmouth, guarding a well defended harbour, and the antiquarian John Leland described it two decades later as forming "a fair bulwark made of late".

The fort was positioned at one end of a new quay built along the harbour, near the entrance to the estuary, and was intended to engage any hostile ships that evaded the guns of Dartmouth and Kingswear castles. It probably originally took the form of a circular tower, similar to the gun tower at Dartmouth Castle. In 1575, the fort was leased by the town to Thomas Carne, a shipwright, subject to it being returned to the town authorities if necessary for the defence of the town. During the 1598 Spanish invasion scare, the town authorities took over control of the fort in accordance with the agreement.

=== 17th century ===
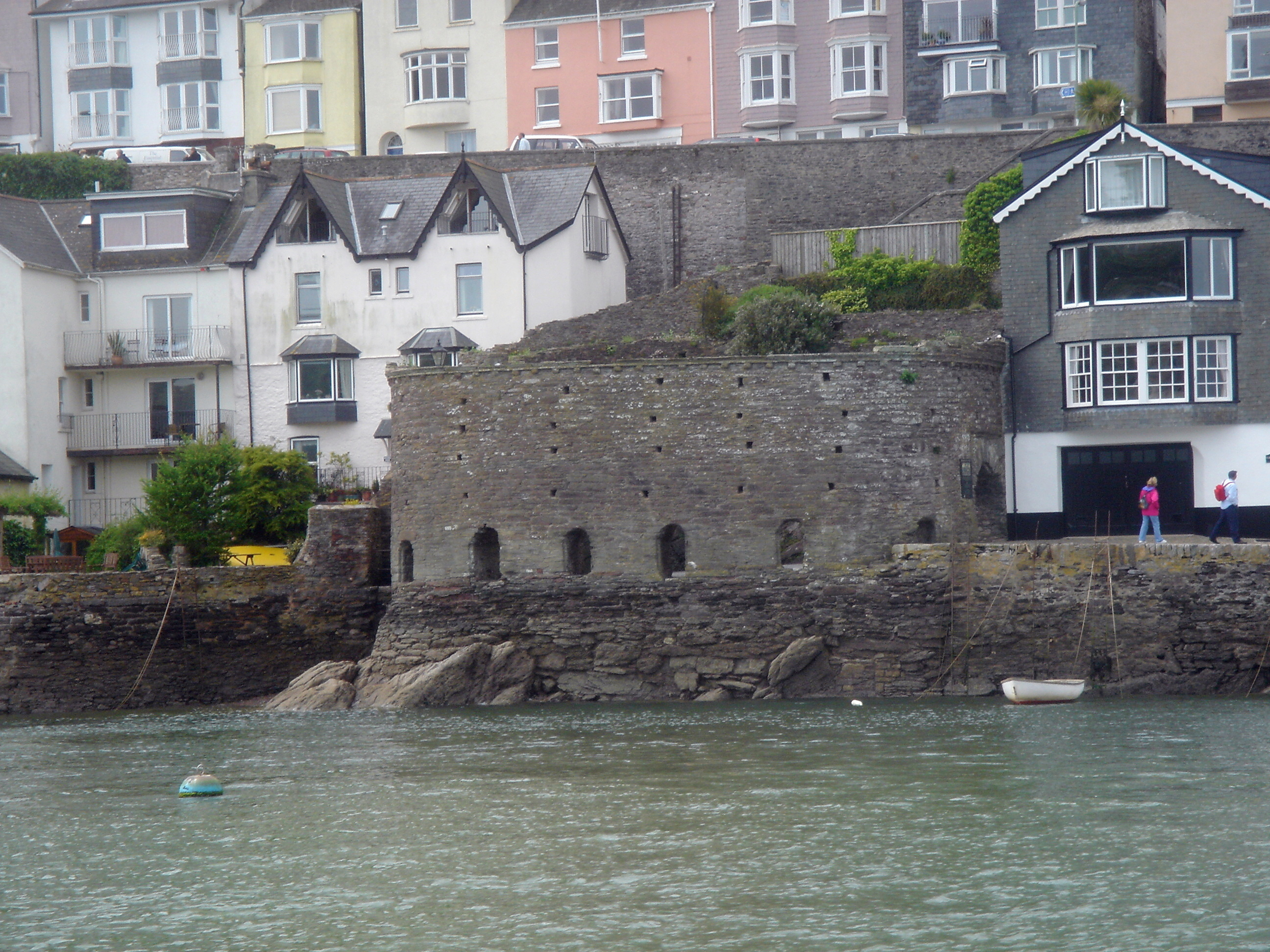
The fort seen from the harbour

At the outbreak of the English Civil War in 1642 between the supporters of Charles I and those of Parliament, Dartmouth initially sided with Parliament. In 1643, Prince Maurice besieged and took the town, whose defences proved vulnerable to a landward attack. In January 1646, Sir Thomas Fairfax led a Parliamentary army to retake Dartmouth, seizing Bayard's Cove Fort and the five iron artillery guns stationed there by the Royalists to protect the estuary.

During the Interregnum, a governor, Sir John Fowell, was appointed by Parliament to run the defences of Dartmouth and to prevent smuggling. An order was given in 1650 for Bayard's Cove Fort to be repaired and brought back into full service. Charles II was restored to the throne in 1660 and initially granted the Dartmouth defences to the control of town once again. By 1662, however, the fortifications in Dartmouth were garrisoned by a royal force of 23 men and overseen by Sir John, who continued in his post as captain and governor until 1677.

=== 18th–21st centuries ===
In the 18th century, the fort was used for storage and fell into decline, until tourists began to come to Dartmouth in the second half of the 19th century and it was restored. During the Second World War, it was briefly used as a machine-gun post. In the 21st century, it is managed by English Heritage and open to visitors, protected under UK law as a Grade I listed building.

Bayard's Cove Fort was one of six English castles identified by English Heritage in September 2022 as being at risk of destruction due to coastal erosion worsened by global warming. The rocky terrace on which the fort is perched frequently floods, and more research is required into the impact of sea level rise on the site. English Heritage launched a fundraising campaign in September 2022 to look into the same (and protect the five other at-risk sites).

== Architecture ==
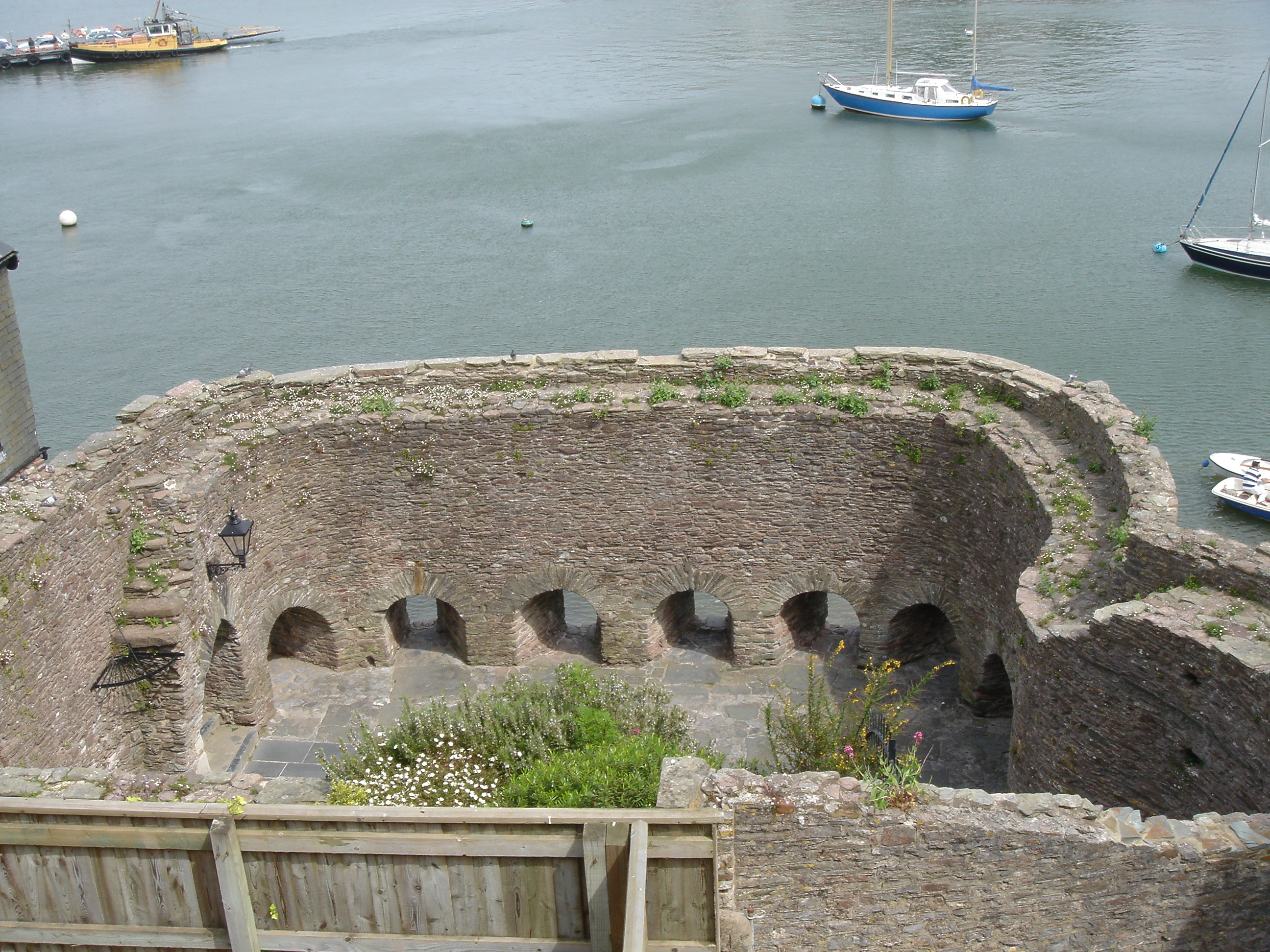
Interior of the blockhouse, showing the wall-walk and gun-ports

The fort comprises a stone blockhouse, probably built in at least two phases, with the original, circular design altered at a later date to form a more irregular shape. The exterior of the blockhouse is approximately 18 by 21 metres (58 by 70 ft), the interior 16 by 15.5 metres (52 by 51 ft), with a limestone rubble wall enclosing an area cut out of the cliff face behind it. The exterior eastern wall is now 1.8 metres (6 ft) thick and 4.6 metres (15 ft) high. Eleven gunports for heavy artillery surround the ground floor close to sea level, similar in design to those at Dartmouth Castle, as well as nearby Little Dennis Fort and St Catherine's Castle. It would originally have had a wall-walk and parapet to protect musketeers. One of the gunports has been converted to form an entrance, and another has been blocked off. The original lean-to accommodation for the garrison lay on the west hand side of the fortification but this, and the internal modifications from its later use as a storage facility, have since been destroyed.

== See also ==
- Castles in Great Britain and Ireland
- List of castles in England

== Bibliography ==
- Davison, Brian K. (2000). Dartmouth Castle, Devon. London, UK: English Heritage. ISBN 1850747598.
- O'Neil, B. H. St. John (1936). "Dartmouth Castle and Other Defences of Dartmouth Haven". Archaeologia. 85: 129–159. doi:10.1017/S0261340900015186.
- Saunders, Andrew (1989). Fortress Britain: Artillery Fortifications in the British Isles and Ireland. Liphook, UK: Beaufort. ISBN 1855120003.
