= Grade I listed buildings in Devon =

Districts of Devon
1 North Devon
2 Torridge
3 Mid Devon
4 East Devon
5 Exeter
6 West Devon
7 Teignbridge
8 Plymouth (Unitary)
9 South Hams
10 Torbay (Unitary)

The county of Devon is divided into ten districts. The districts of Devon are Exeter, East Devon, Mid Devon, North Devon, Torridge, West Devon, South Hams, Teignbridge and the unitary authorities Plymouth and Torbay.

As there are 427 Grade I listed buildings in the county they have been split into separate lists for each district.

- Grade I listed buildings in East Devon
- Grade I listed buildings in Exeter
- Grade I listed buildings in Mid Devon
- Grade I listed buildings in North Devon
- Grade I listed buildings in Plymouth
- Grade I listed buildings in South Hams
- Grade I listed buildings in Teignbridge
- Grade I listed buildings in Torbay
- Grade I listed buildings in Torridge
- Grade I listed buildings in West Devon

== See also ==
- Grade II* listed buildings in Devon
