= Totnes Museum =

Museum in Devon, England

Coordinates: 50.43134°N 3.68662°W

Totnes Museum (formerly Totnes Elizabethan House and Museum) is a local museum in the town of Totnes, south Devon, in southwest England.

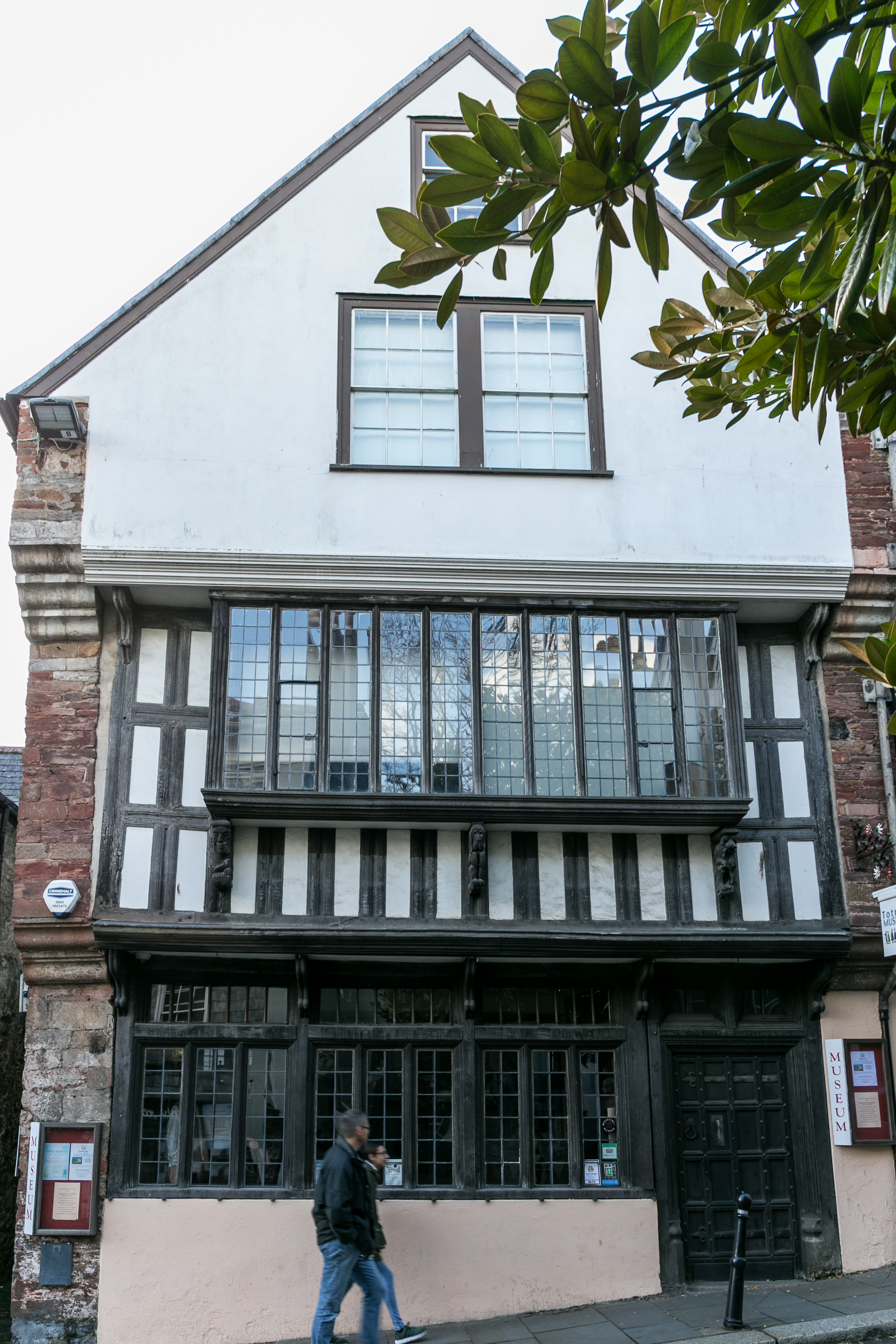
Totnes Museum's Elizabethan House as seen from Fore Street, Totnes.

The museum is housed in a Grade I listed Elizabethan merchant's house that was built c.1575. The house still has many original features. In 1958 Totnes Town Council purchased the Elizabethan House and carefully restored it to its former glory. In 1961 the Elizabethan House would open to the public as Totnes Museum. Today Totnes Museum is run by the charitable organisation Totnes Museum Trust and is free admission.

Totnes Museum extends over two buildings and three floors including twelve gallery rooms, a courtyard, and a herb garden. Towards the back of Totnes Museum is Totnes Archive.

The collections date from 5000BC to the present day. These range from early archaeological finds, coins minted in Totnes during Saxon times, Elizabethan artifacts and Victorian ephemera. The museum aims to entertain and educate visitors with the cultural, economic, and social history of Totnes.

The museum various museum galleries include the Forehall, a Kitchen exhibition and the Babbage Room, which presents a history of Charles Babbage, the Victorian mathematician who invented the Difference Engine and Analytical Engine, working with Ada Lovelace. This was the mechanical precursors of the modern computer. Babbage spent his youth in Totnes and studied at King Edward VI Grammar School there.

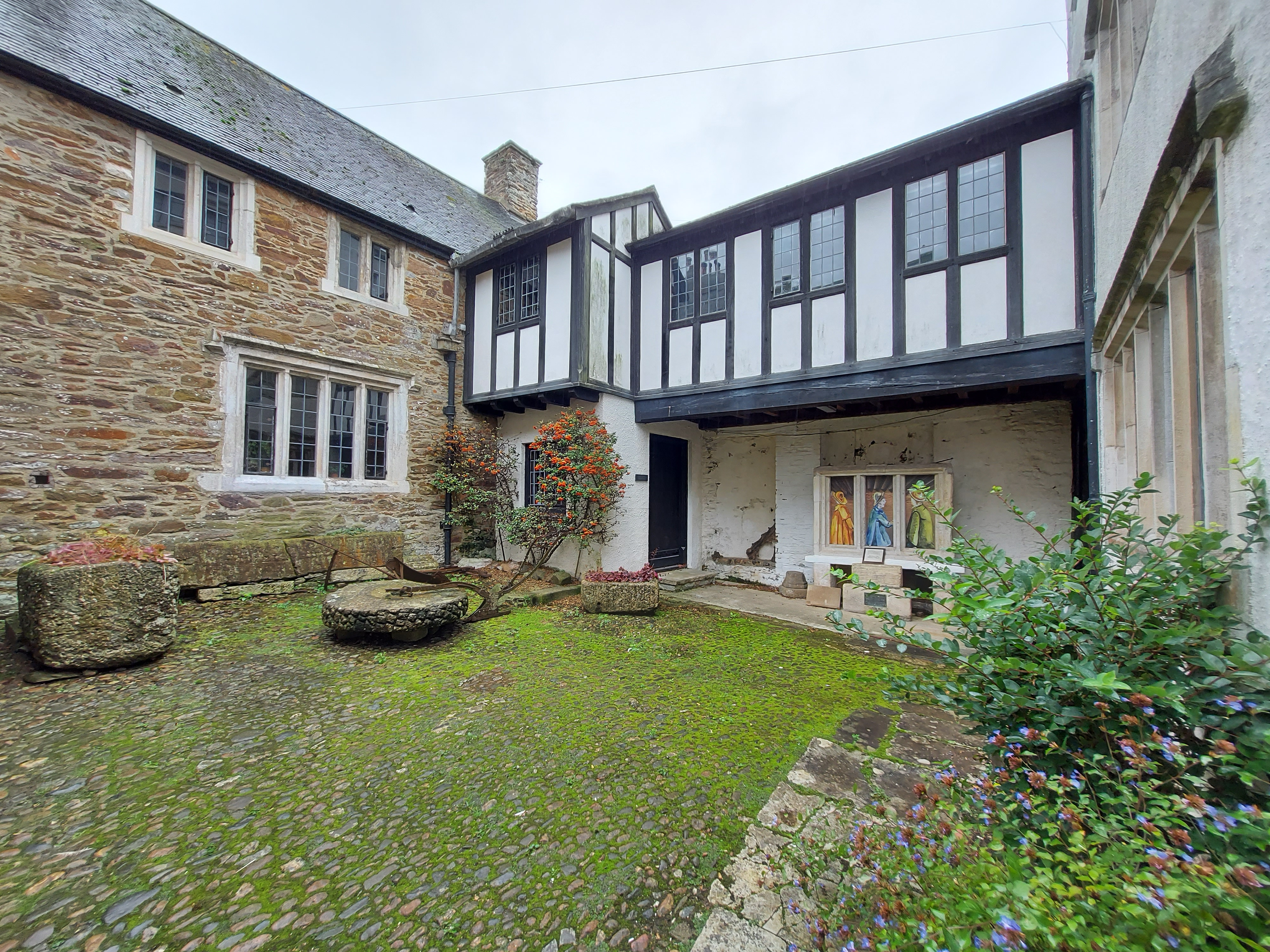
An image of Totnes Museum's Courtyard from the direction of Fore Street

== Totnes Archive ==
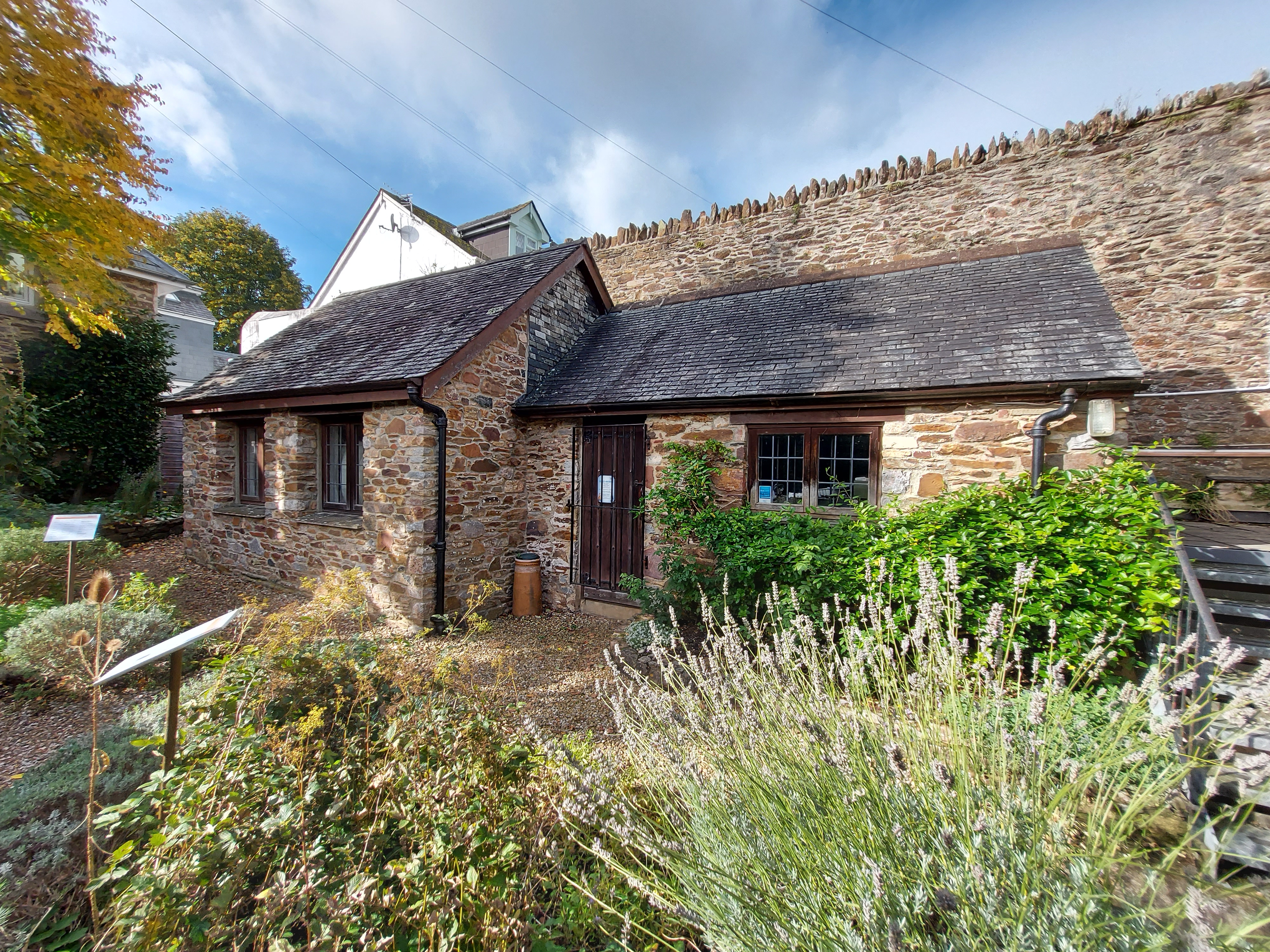
An image of Totnes Archive

The site also contains the Totnes Archive at the rear of the building which contains information for study of Totnes, South Devon and other related material – books, fiches, transcripts, photographs, and local newspapers from 1860 – of particular interest to those seeking information on Totnes history, buildings and their own family connections in the area. The Totnes Archive is open for public drop-ins on Thursdays and Fridays.

== Totnes Museum's Garden ==
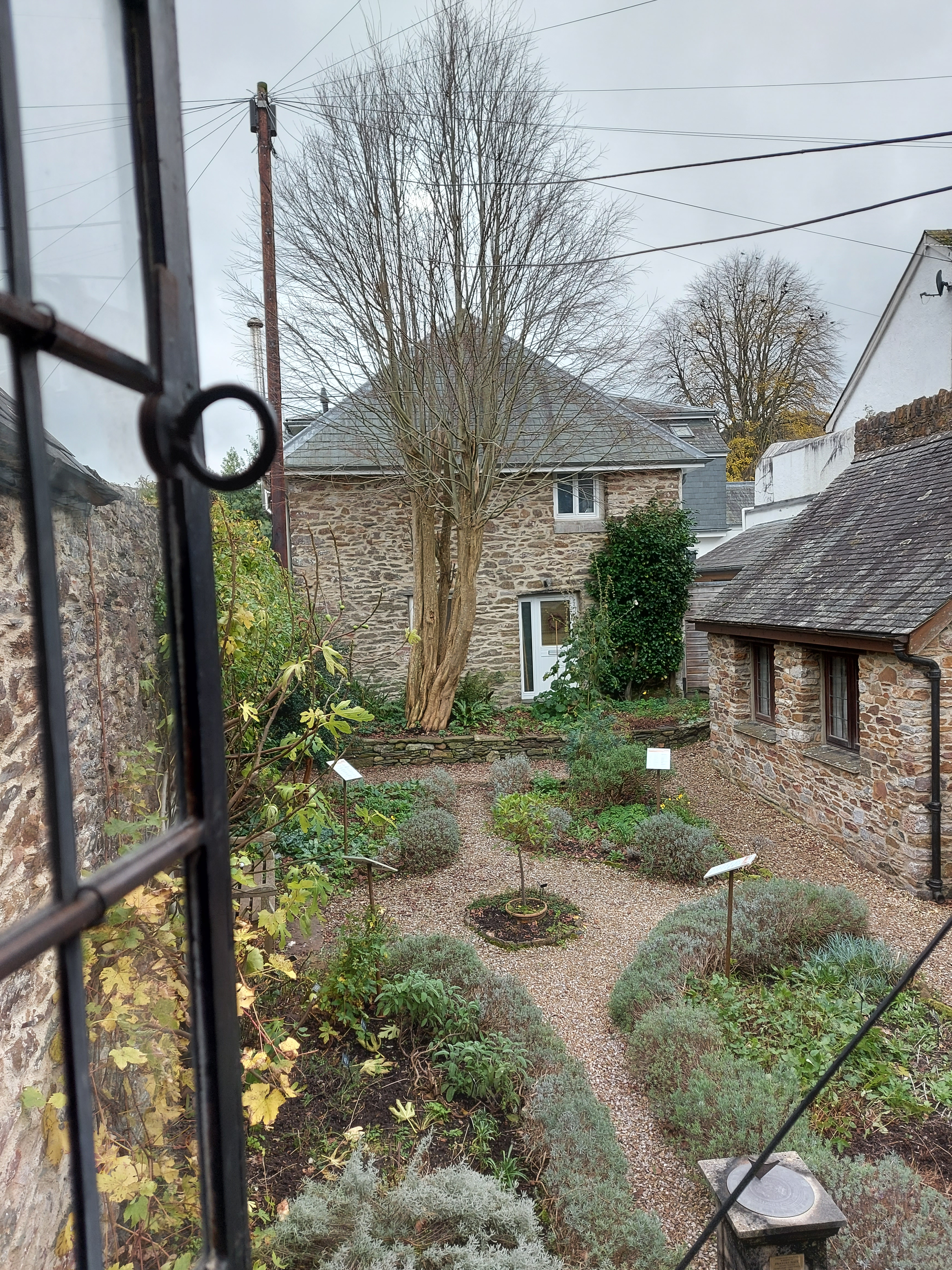
A view to Totnes Museum's Garden from one of the Museum's window

Totnes Museum also has a garden which can be visited all year round at the back of the museum. The Garden has many herbs once found in gardens of the Elizabethan period among various other plants. Totnes Museum's garden is looked after by volunteers.

== Haunted Museum? ==
Totnes Museum is also reportedly haunted by visitors. Some of the paranormal experiences often reported include supernatural seasickness caused by a ships mast used by the spiral stairs and a variety of ghosts. These are reportedly cats, an angry man, a little boy and a little girl. To this day paranormal investigations take place throughout the museum.

== See also ==
- Grade I listed buildings in Devon
- List of museums in Devon
- Totnes Castle
- Totnes Guildhall

== Gallery ==
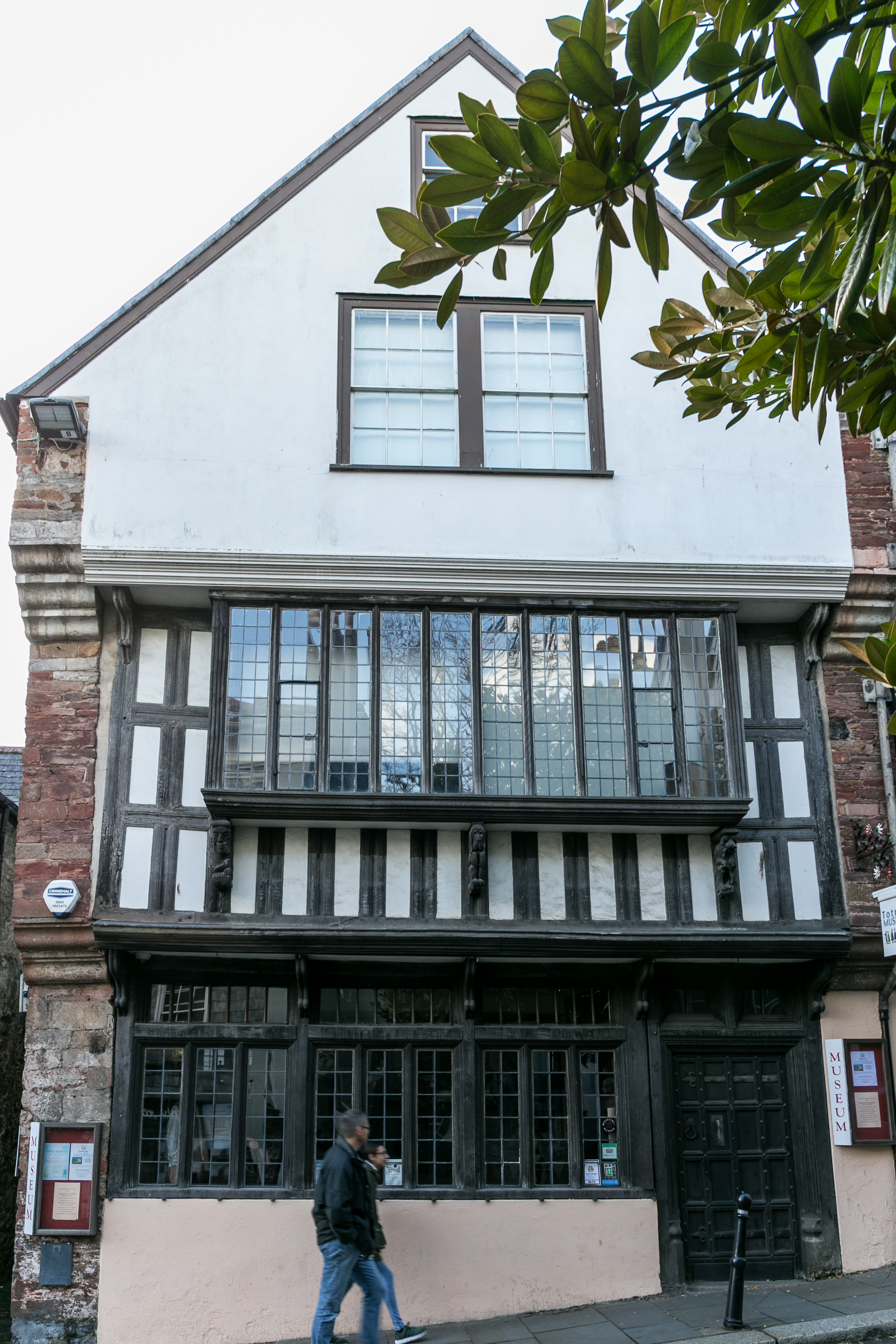
Totnes Museum from the front.

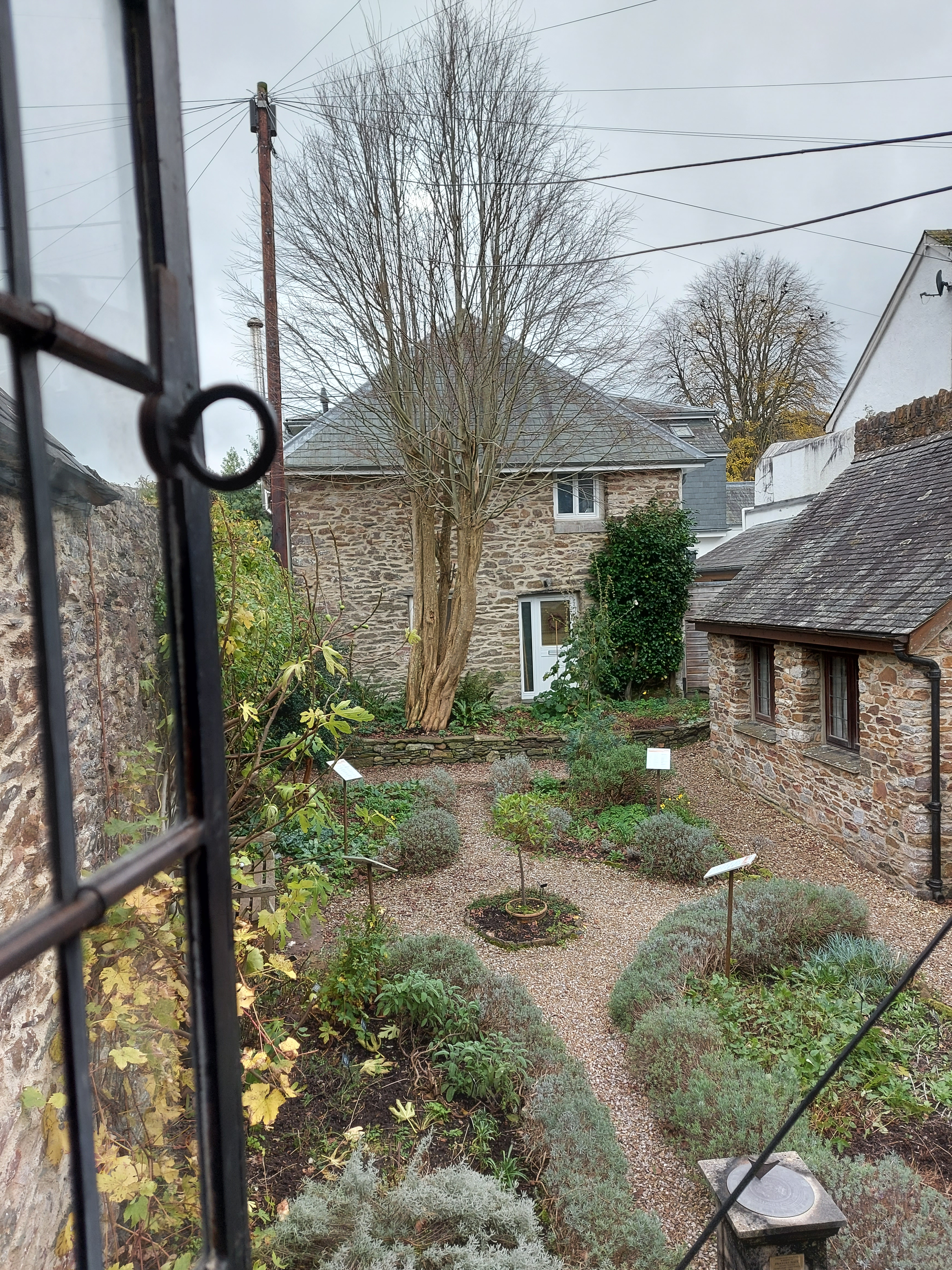
Image of Totnes Museum's Garden taken from a museum window.

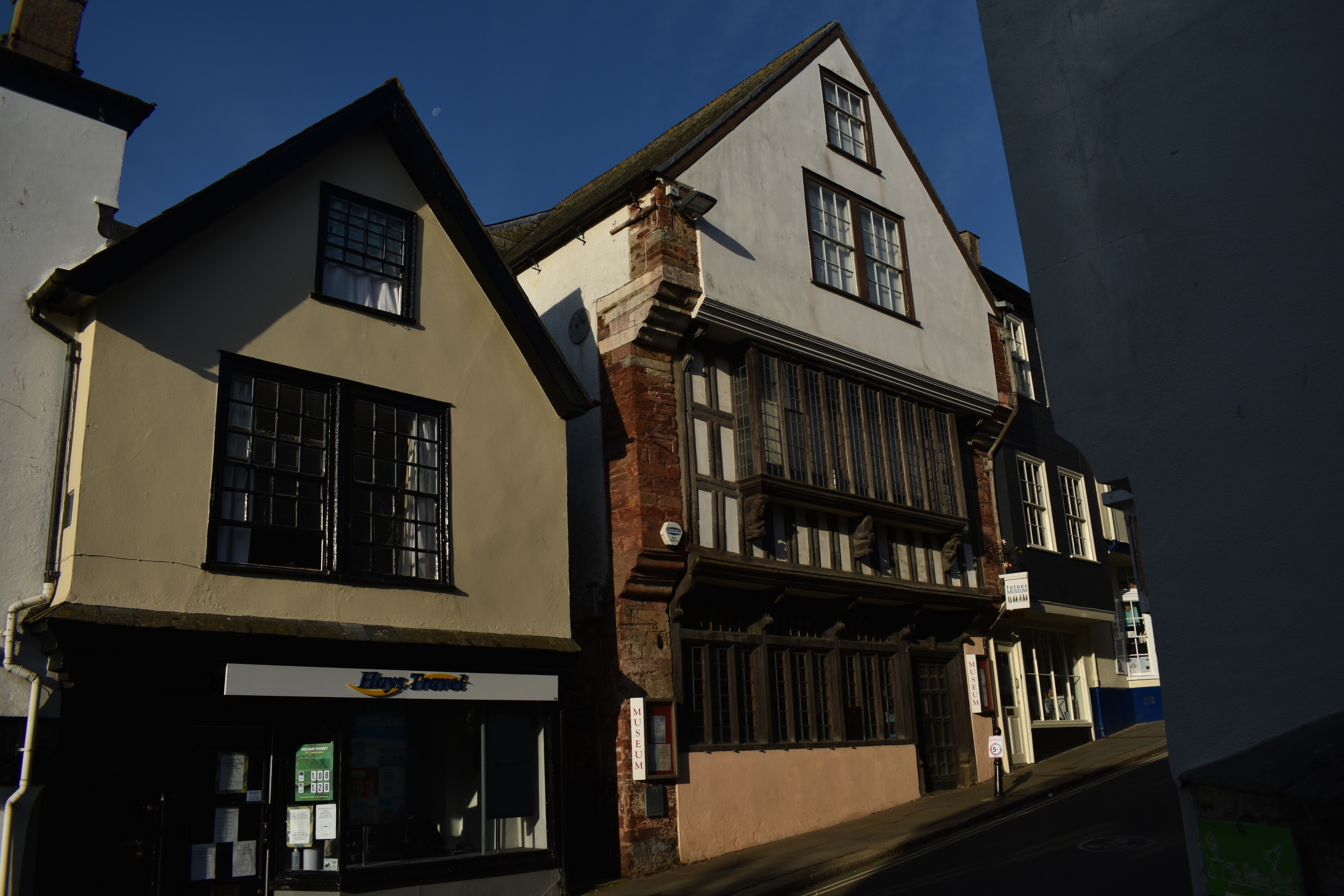
68 & 70 Fore Street, Totnes. Totnes Museum is 70 Fore Street

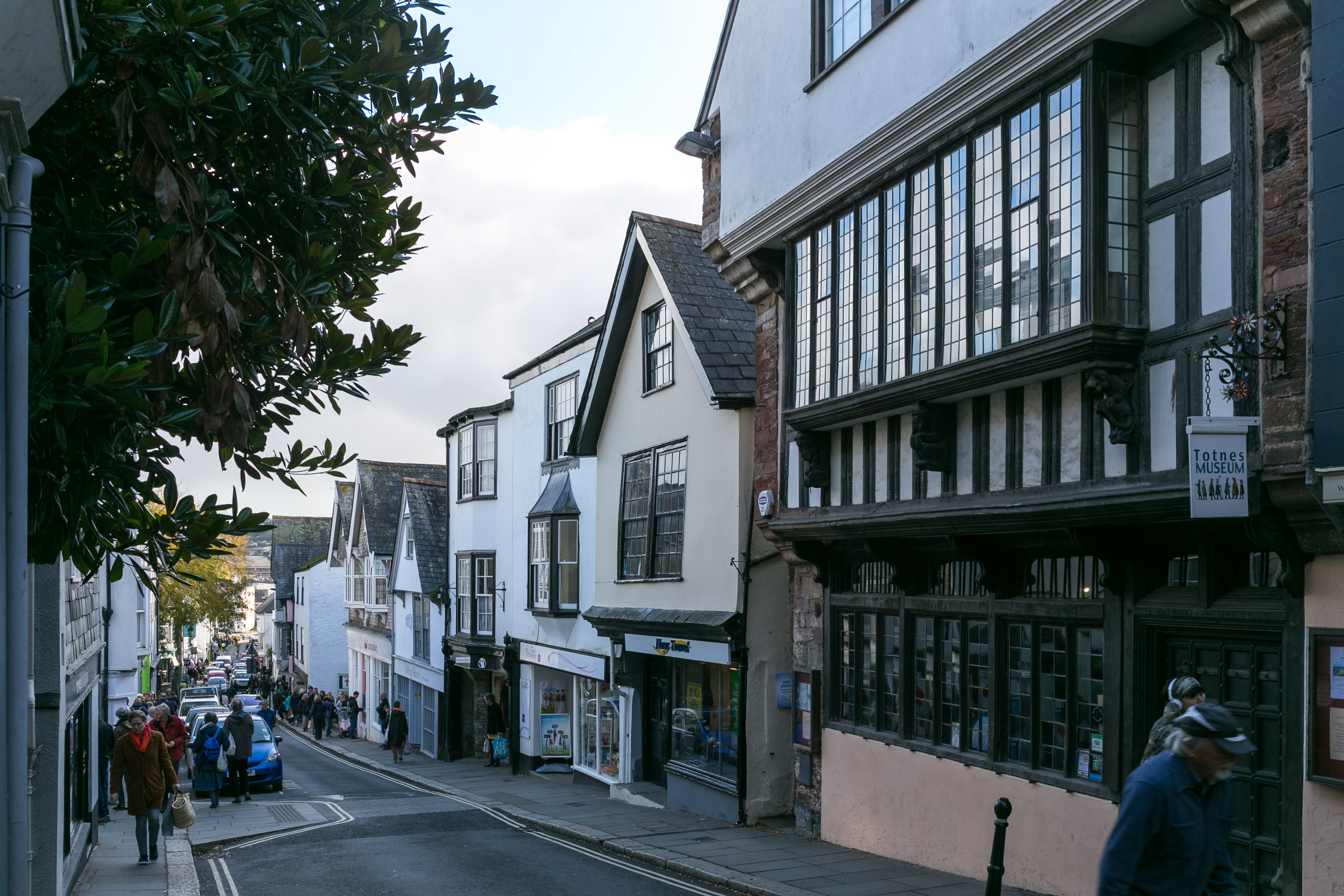
Totnes Elizabethan House Museum looking down Fore Street

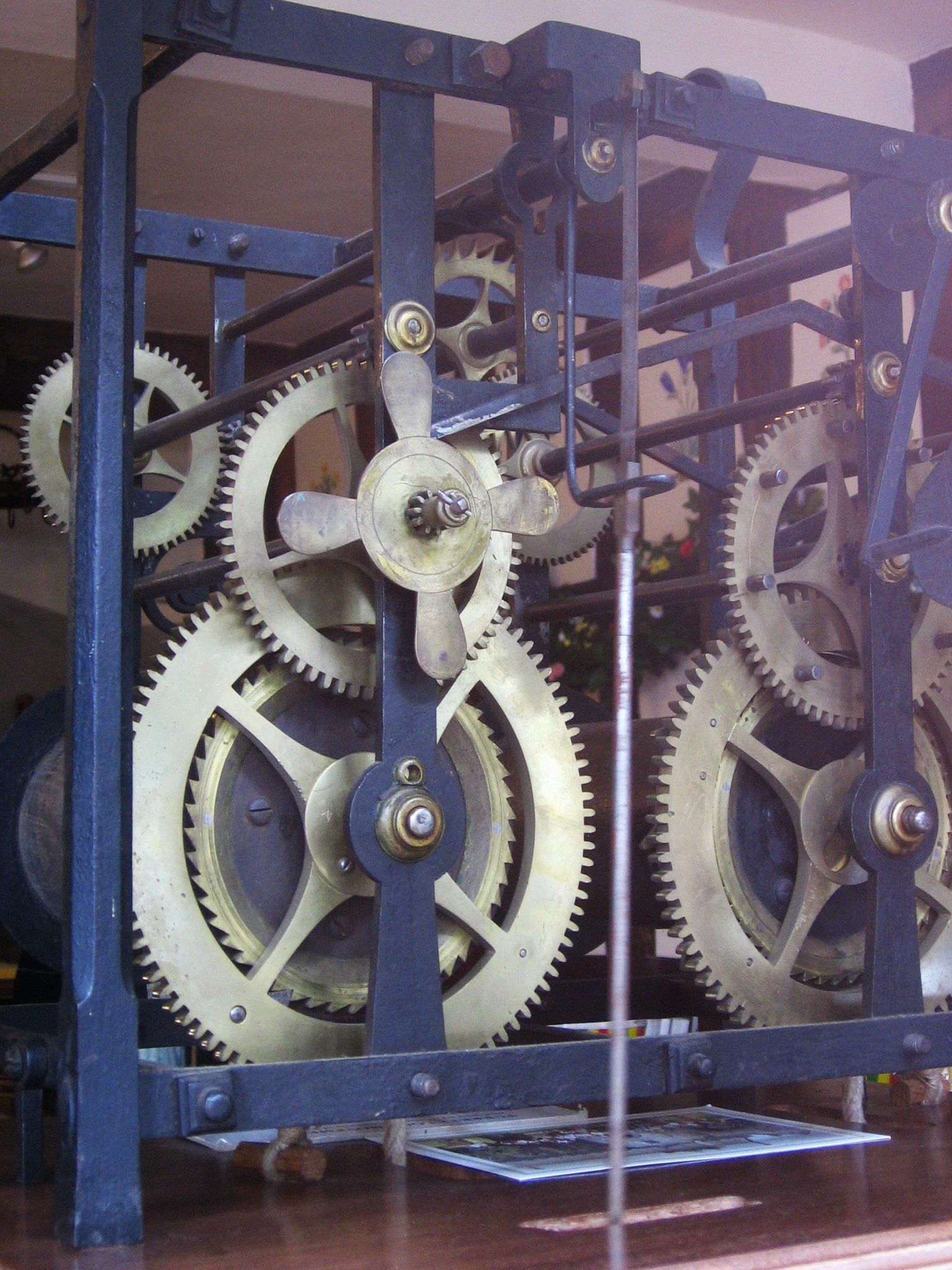
Stumbels turret clock on display in Totnes Museum.

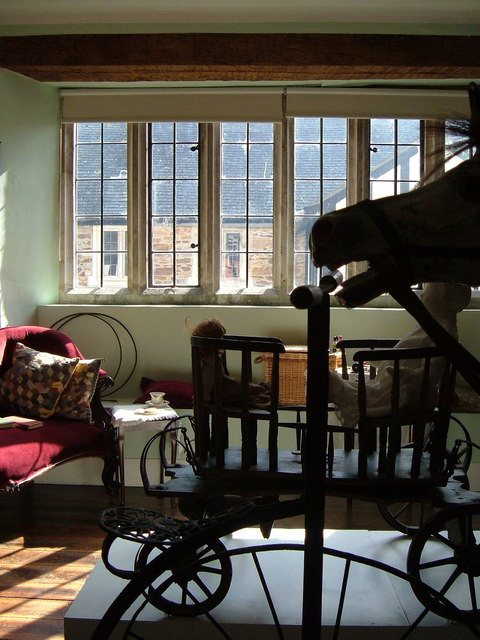
Central Hall, once known as the Victorian Nursery, of Totnes Museum

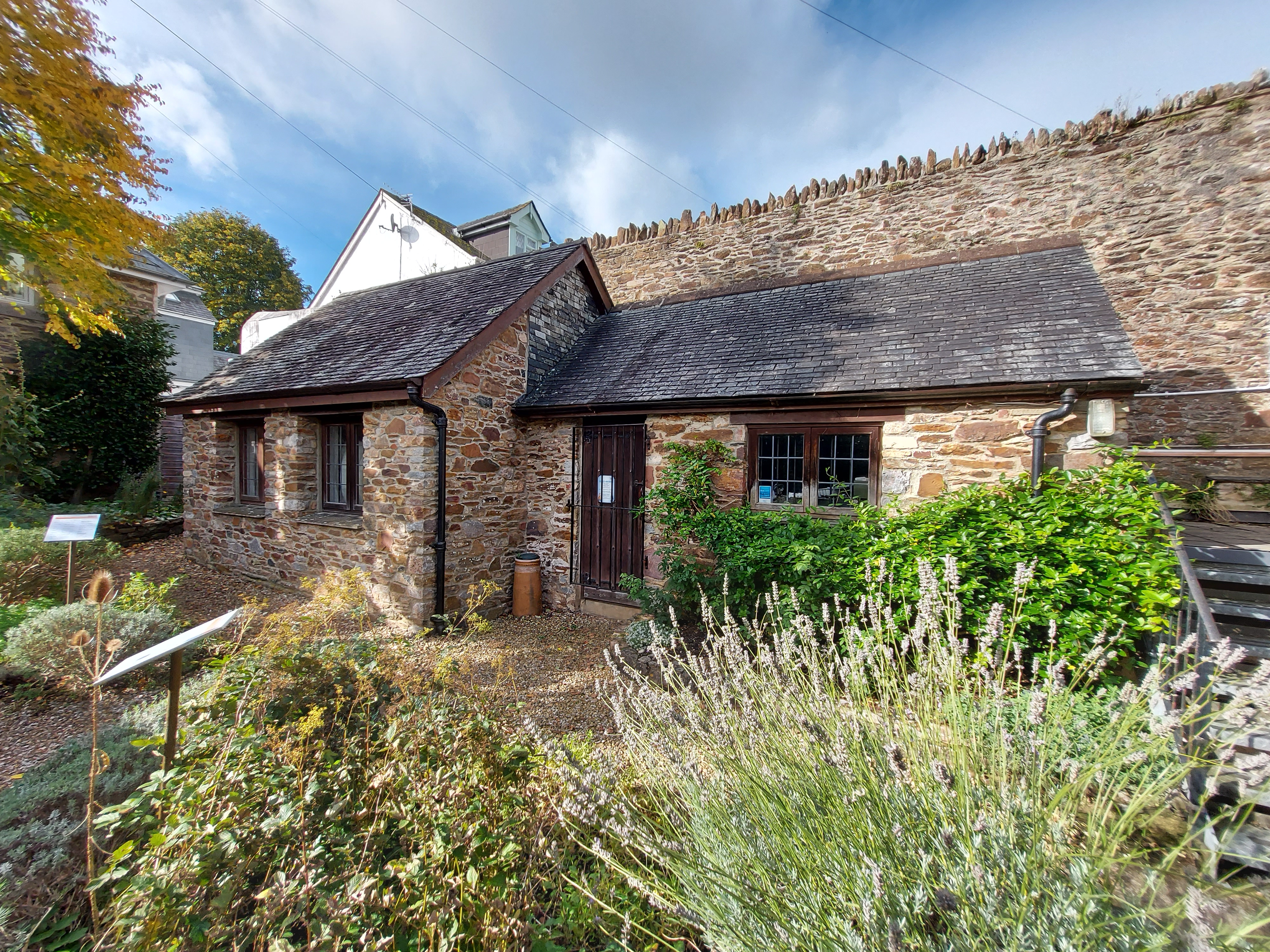
An image of Totnes Archive from the Garden of Totnes Museum

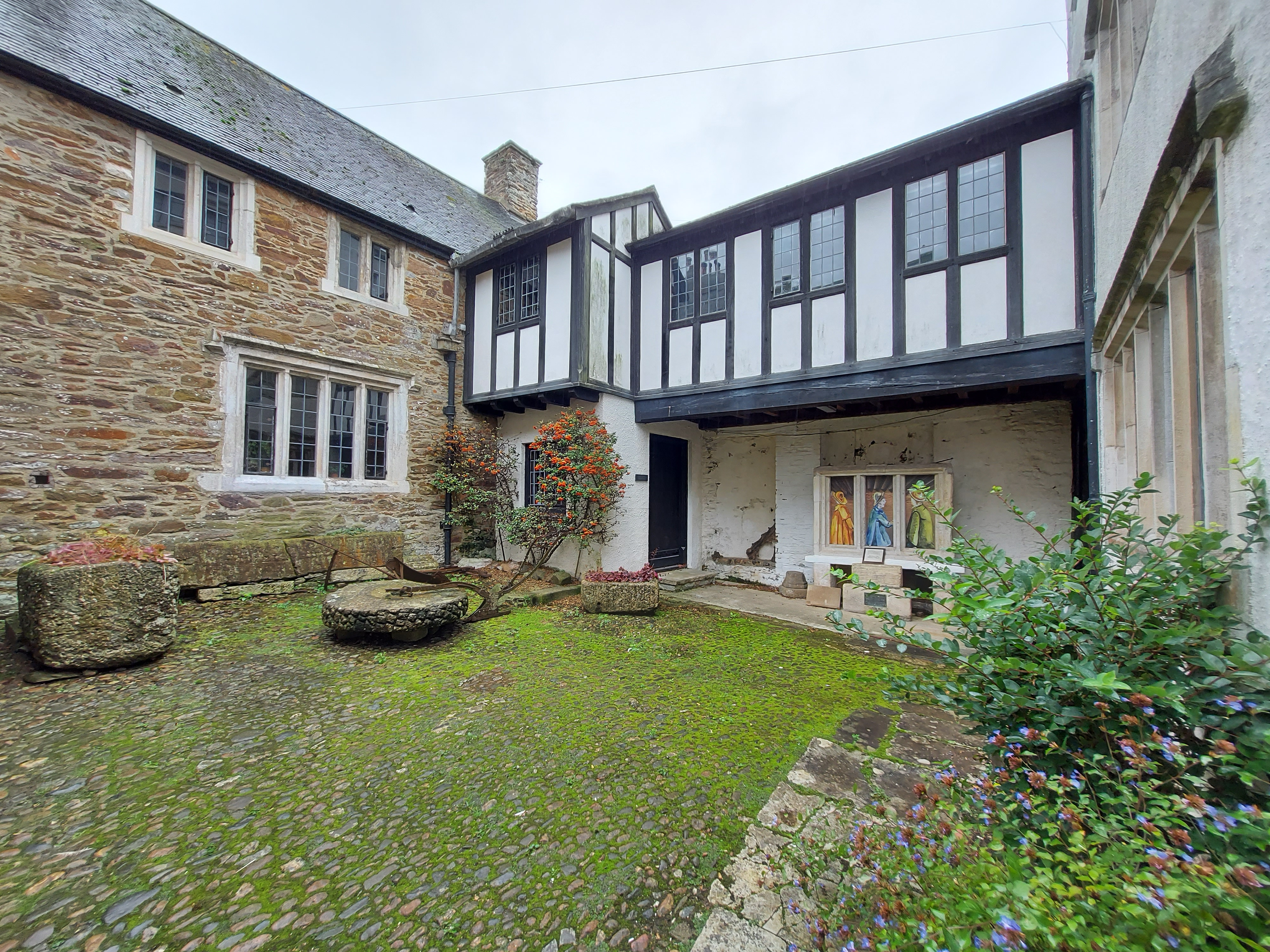
An image of Totnes Museum's Courtyard from the direction of Fore Street
