= William Cumming Henley =

- Born: 6 January 1860; Dartmouth, Devon, England
- Died: 6 November 1919 (aged 59); Dartmouth, Devon, England
- Occupation: Ironmonger
- Known for: Self taught scientist, naturalist, artist, collector

William Cumming Henley (6 January 1860 – 6 November 1919) was a self-taught scientist, artist and collector who was born, educated and died in Dartmouth, Devon in England, and whose lifetime collection of artefacts is held in the Dartmouth Museum.

Henley is the subject of a biography, William Cumming Henley: His days and ways.
