= Dartmouth Museum =

Local museum in Devon, England

Coordinates: 50.3519°N 3.5786°W

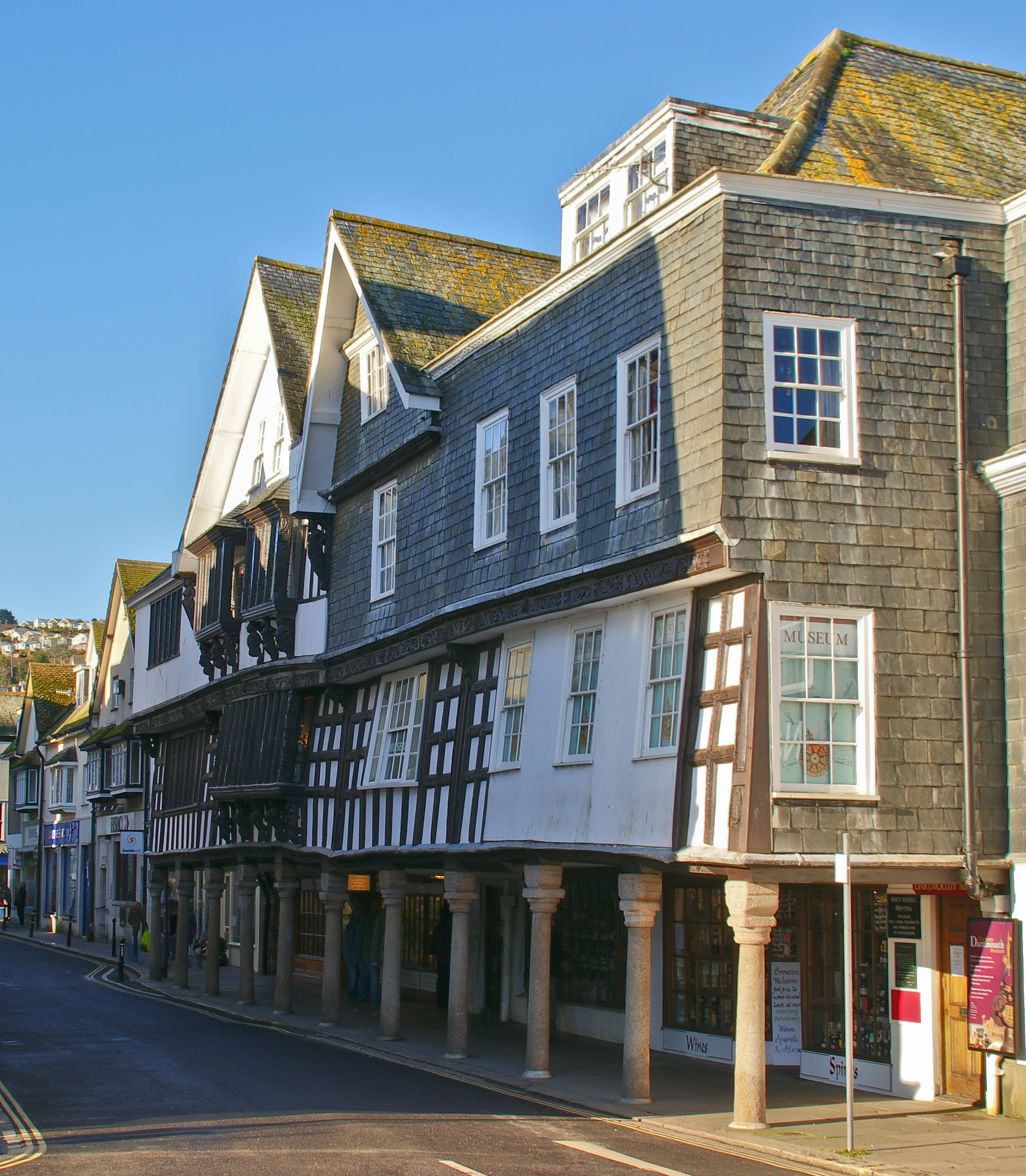
The museum entrance is at the right hand side of the picture

Dartmouth Museum is a local museum in Dartmouth, Devon, which displays and chronicles the history of the port of Dartmouth. It moved to its current location in the 1950s and is housed in a merchant's house, No. 6 the Butterwalk which, in 1671, entertained Charles II and where he held court during a storm which forced him to stay in the port. The museum is run by the Dartmouth Museum Association, a registered charity.

The museum was refurbished during the winters of 2010 and 2011 and has a large collection of models of sailing ships, and of ships in bottles. The latter is referred to as the Dawe Collection. The museum building itself is part of the exhibition which includes local records and photographs, and a plaster ceiling believed to be unique showing the Tree of Jesse. The museum also houses the Henley Collection, a collection of artefacts and scientific material collected by William Henley (1860–1919), all of which were previously part of a separate museum on Dartmouth's Anzac Street.

The entrance to the museum is in Dartmouth's Butterwalk, via a spiral staircase built counterclockwise around a ship's mast.
