= Grade I listed buildings in Torbay =

There are more than 9000 Grade I listed buildings in England. This page is a list of these buildings in the district of Torbay in Devon.

== Torbay ==
Name	Location	Type	Completed (Note: The date given is the date used by Historic England as significant for the initial building or that of an important part in the structure's description.)	Date designated	Grid ref. (Note: Sometimes known as OSGB36, the grid reference is based on the British national grid reference system used by the Ordnance Survey.) Geo-coordinates	Entry number (Note: The "List Entry Number" is a unique number assigned to each listed building and scheduled monument by Historic England.)	Image
Parish Church of All Saints	Babbacombe, Torbay	Parish Church	1868-1874	20 November 1952	SX9247665274; 50°28′39″N 3°31′00″W	1280043	Parish Church of All Saints More images
Parish Church of St John the Baptist	Torbay	Parish Church	12th century	13 March 1951	SX8863460836; 50°26′12″N 3°34′10″W	1195097	Parish Church of St John the Baptist More images
Parish Church of St John the Evangelist	Torbay	Parish Church	1861-1873	20 November 1952	SX9188663653; 50°27′46″N 3°31′28″W	1206814	Parish Church of St John the Evangelist More images
The Spanish Barn, Torre Abbey	Torbay	Abbey	Could be as early as 13th century	20 November 1952	SX9072263746; 50°27′48″N 3°32′28″W	1280012	The Spanish Barn, Torre Abbey More images
Torre Abbey	Torbay	Abbey	Founded 1196	20 November 1952	SX9074863816; 50°27′50″N 3°32′26″W	1206852	Torre Abbey More images
Roman Church of Our Lady, Help of Christians and St Denis	Torquay	Roman Catholic church	1865-9	14 February 1972	SX9191465881; 50°28′58″N 3°31′29″W	1206830	Roman Church of Our Lady, Help of Christians and St Denis More images
