= Dartmouth Butterwalk =

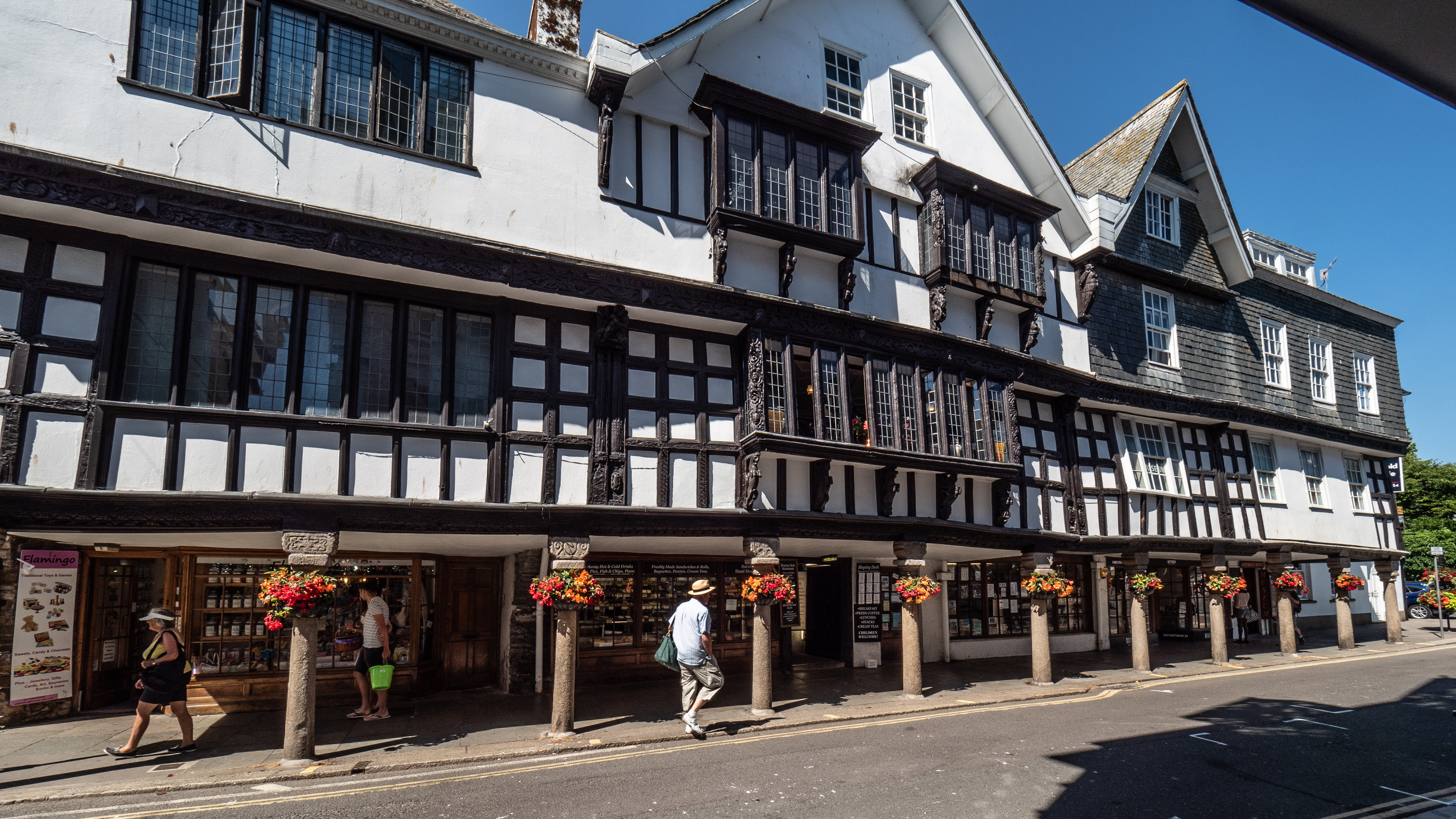
- "Dartmouth's pride" - The Butterwalk in 2010

- Location within Devon
- Interactive map of Dartmouth Butterwalk
- 50°21′07″N 3°34′43″W
- Type: Arcade
- Location: Dartmouth

History
- Formed: 1635-40
- Original use: Merchants' shops and houses

Site notes
- Restored: 1950s after bomb damage during World War II
- Current use: Museum / shops

Listed Building – Grade I
- Official name: No. 6, The Butterwalk, Duke Street
- Designated: 14 September 1949
- Reference no.: 1197516

Listed Building – Grade I
- Official name: No. 8, The Butterwalk, Duke Street
- Designated: 14 September 1949
- Reference no.: 1197517

Listed Building – Grade I
- Official name: No. 10, The Butterwalk, Duke Street
- Designated: 14 September 1949
- Reference no.: 1197518

Listed Building – Grade I
- Official name: No. 12, The Butterwalk, Duke Street
- Designated: 14 September 1949
- Reference no.: 1197519

The Butterwalk, in Dartmouth, Devon, England, is a row of four merchants' houses and shops dating from the 1630s. Historic England describes the arcade as "one of the finest rows of merchants' houses dating from the first half of the 17th century anywhere in England". Each of the four houses in the row is designated a Grade I listed building.

== History ==
Historic England gives 1635–1640 as the construction dates for the arcade, drawing on datestones set into the buildings. The architectural historian Bridget Cherry, in her Devon volume of the Pevsner Buildings of England series, revised and reissued in 2004, gives a slightly earlier date of commencement of 1628 and notes that the row was built on reclaimed land on the bank of the River Dart. The development began as a partnership between two local burghers, William Gurney and Mark Hawkins, the latter of whom served as receiver of Dartmouth, and was part of a wider undertaking that saw the construction of the New Quay on the Dart. In 1635, Gurney sold out to Hawkins who had completed the row by 1640, at a total cost of some £2,500.

In 1943, during World War II, the Butterwalk was severely damaged by German bombing. Restoration was undertaken in David Nye & Partners in the 1950s. (Note: The Butterwalk originally had a further house at its eastern end, fronted by two more pillars on the ground-floor arcade, but this was not reconstructed in the post-war restoration.) No. 6 now houses the Dartmouth Museum on its upper storey. The museum contains a chamber, The King's Room, named in honour of Charles II, who was entertained to lunch in the Butterwalk in July 1671, after being forced to take shelter at Dartmouth during a storm when he was sailing from Plymouth to London. No. 12, whose upper storey also forms part of the museum, contains an important ceiling depicting the Tree of Jesse, which is thought to be the only such depiction undertaken in plaster. (Note: The Jesse ceiling was badly damaged during the bombing in World War II and was reconstructed using original fragments which were recovered following the air raids.)

== Architecture and description ==
The Butterwalk is of three storeys with attics above. The first storey has a large jetty which extends over the street frontage and is supported by eleven granite piers. The upper storeys are faced with elaborate wood carvings. Cherry describes the arcade as "Dartmouth's pride", and notes the "sumptuous standard" of the buildings' interiors. Historic England considers the arcade as "one of the finest rows of merchants' houses dating from the first half of the 17th century anywhere in England". Each of the four houses in the row is designated a Grade I listed building.

== Gallery ==
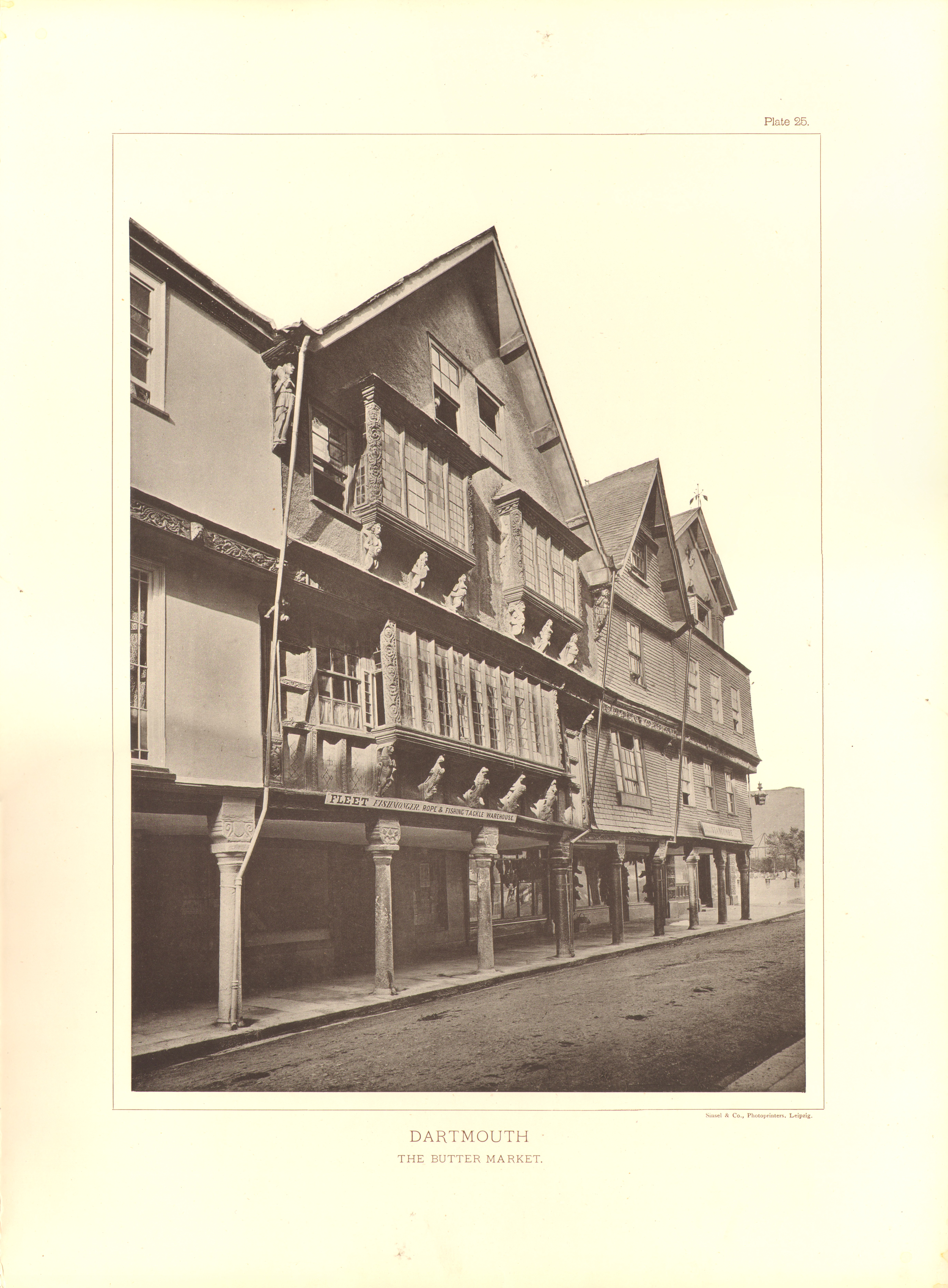
The Butterwalk c.1894

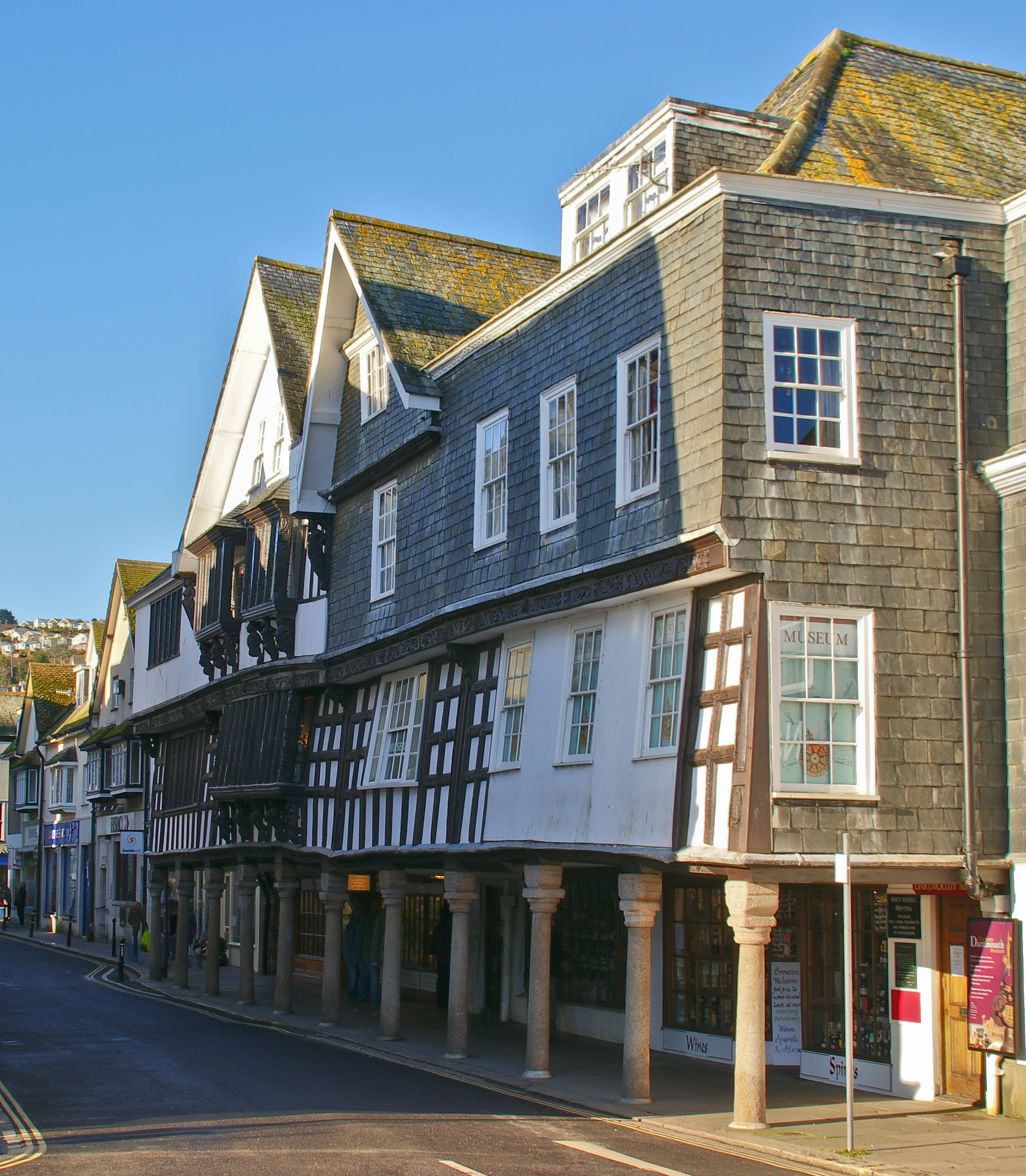
An oblique view

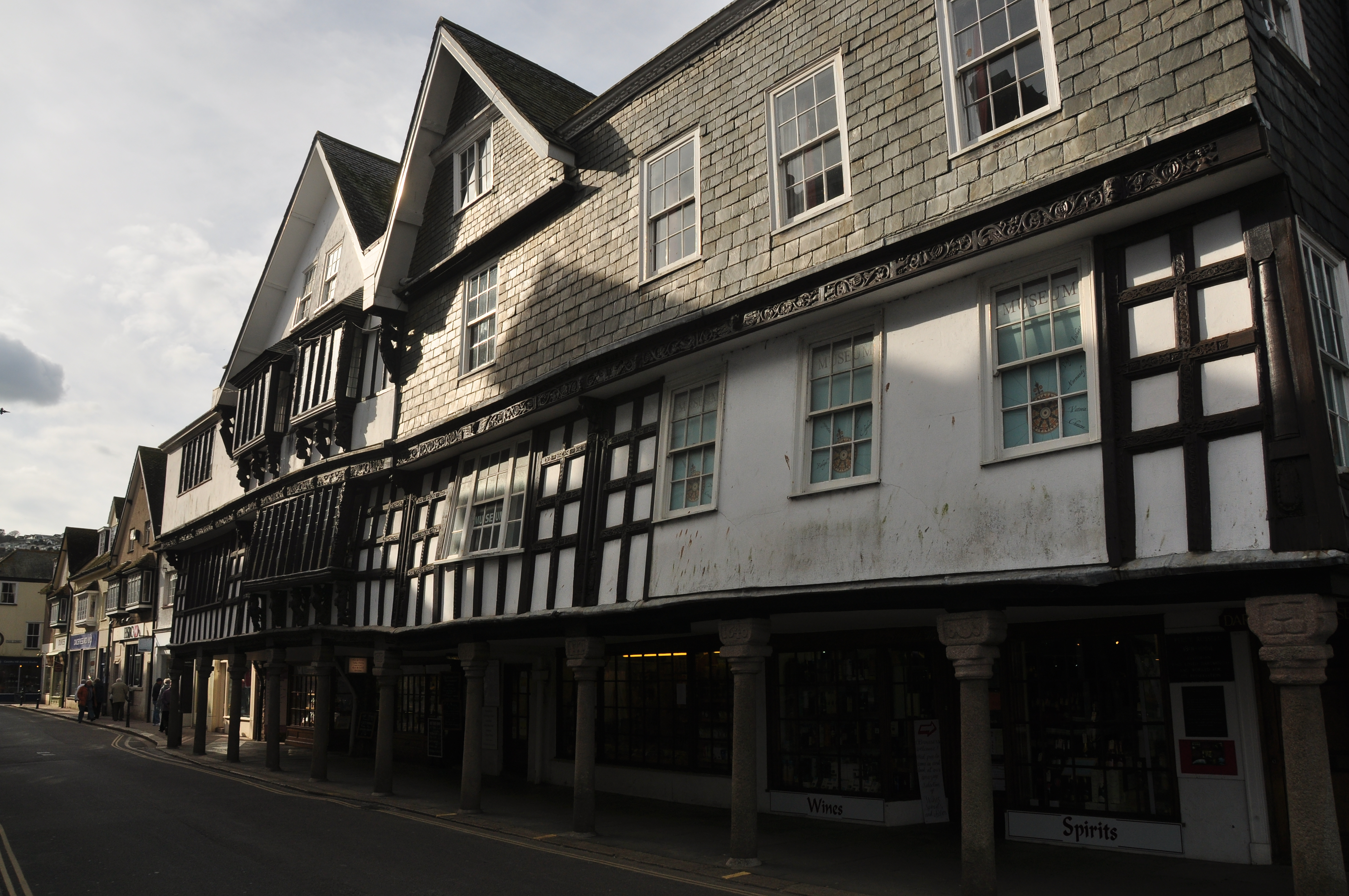
View along the Butterwalk

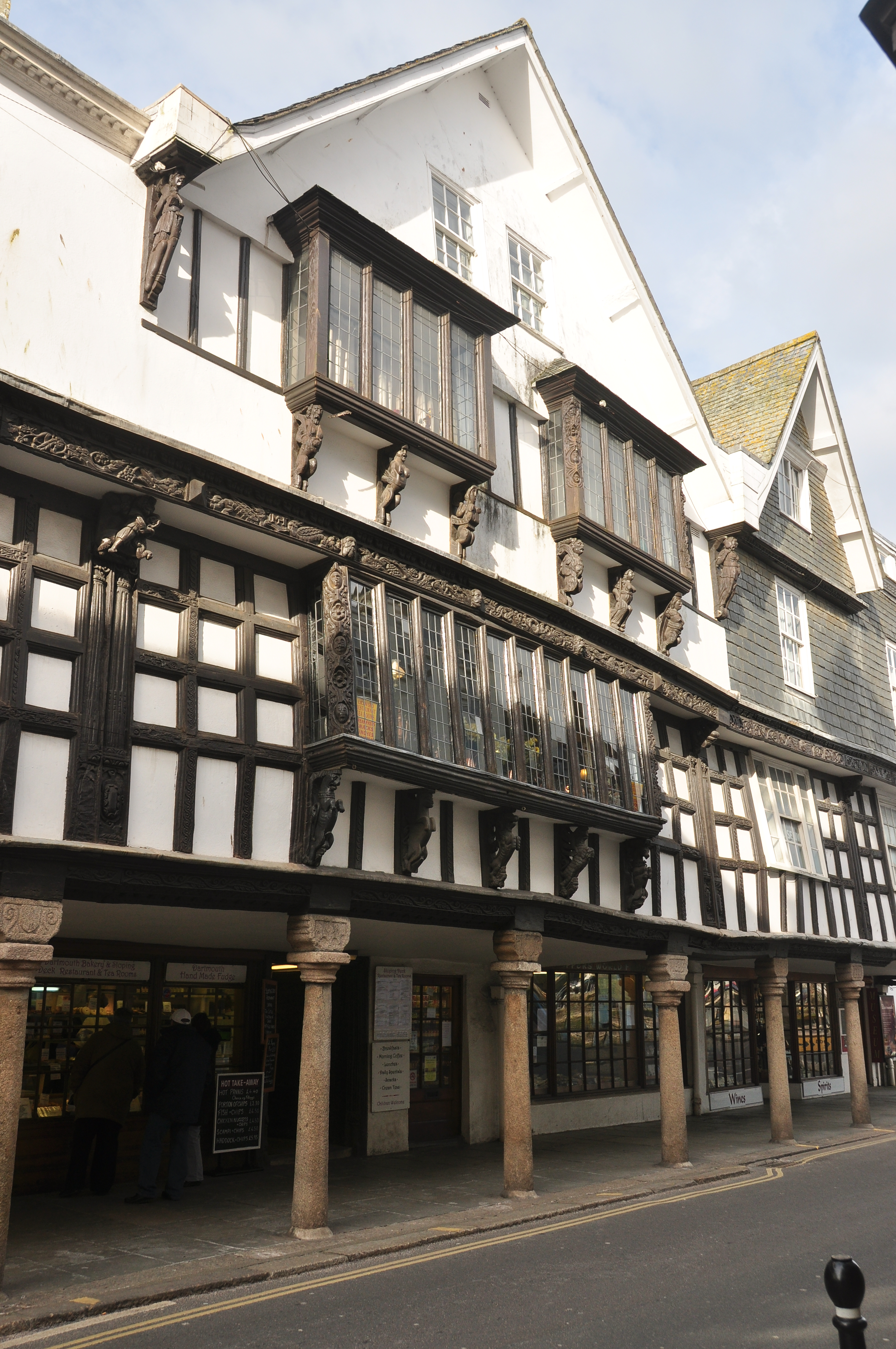
Detail of the wood carving on the frontage

== Sources ==
- Cherry, Bridget; Pevsner, Nikolaus (2004). Devon. The Buildings of England. New Haven, US and London: Yale University Press. ISBN 978-0-300-09596-8. OCLC 972033000.
