= North Huish =

Village in Devon, England

Coordinates: 50°24′N 3°49′W

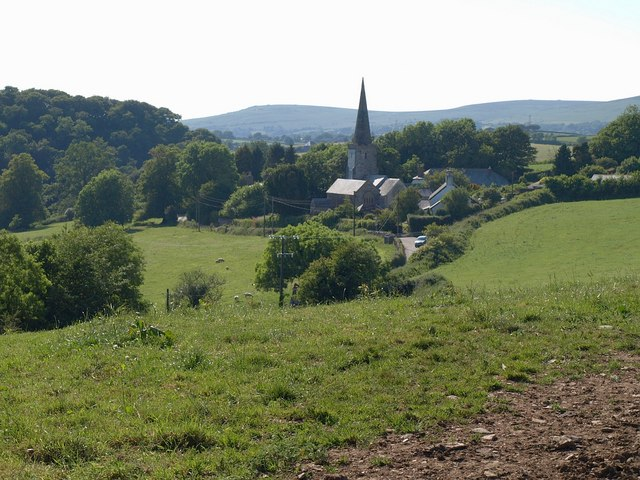
- North Huish, viewed from east, with the hills of Ugborough Moor (the southern tip of Dartmoor) behind, to the north

- Location within Devon
- Population: 360 (2001 census)
- OS grid reference: SX7156
- Civil parish: North Huish
- District: South Hams
- Shire county: Devon
- Region: South West
- Country: England
- Sovereign state: United Kingdom

North Huish is a village, civil parish, former ecclesiastical parish and former manor in the South Hams district of Devon, England. The village is situated about 8 miles (13 kilometres) south-west of the town of Totnes. Avonwick is the largest village in the parish, Avonwick was only named that in 1870 and parts were previously part of different parishes until the late 20th century. The parish had a population of 360 in the 2001 census.

== St Mary's Church ==
St Mary's Church, the parish church built in the 14th century, is now a redundant church in the care of the Churches Conservation Trust. It was declared redundant on 1 March 1993, and was vested in the Trust on 10 August 1998.

== Manor ==
During the reign of King Richard I (1189-1199) the manor was held by John Damarell (Latinized to de Albamara), whose male descendants held it for many generations. It then passed to the Trenchard family and thence to Tremain (alias Tremayn) of Collacombe.

== Historic estates ==
Within the parish are situated various historic estates including:

- Norreys, a seat of the le Norreys family until the reign of King Edward III (1327-1377), when the heiress married Sir John Fortescue (fl.1422) of Shepham, Captain of the captured Castle of Meaux, 25 miles (40 kilometres) north-east of Paris, following the Siege of Meaux during the Hundred Years' War.
- Boterford.
- Black Hall, a seat of a junior branch of the Fowell family of nearby Fowelscombe in the parish of Ugborough.
