= St Mary's Church, North Huish =

Church in Devon, England

St Mary's Church
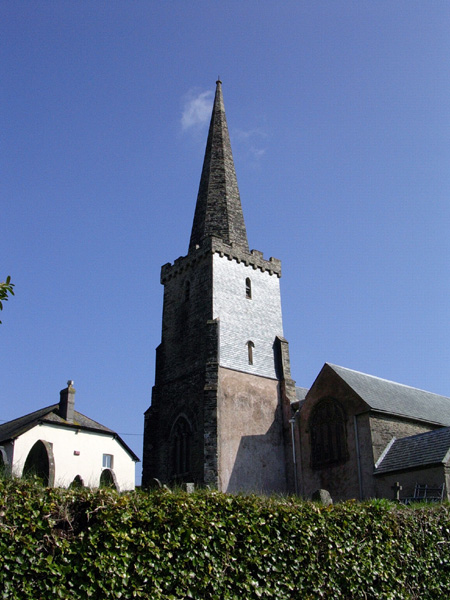

- Location within Devon
- 50°23′41″N 3°48′52″W
- Location: North Huish, Devon, England

History
- Built: 14th century

Listed Building – Grade I
- Official name: Church of St Mary
- Designated: 9 February 1961
- Reference no.: 1108208

St Mary's Church in North Huish, Devon, England was built in the 14th century. It is recorded in the National Heritage List for England as a designated Grade I listed building, and is now a redundant church in the care of the Churches Conservation Trust. It was declared redundant on 1 March 1993, and was vested in the Trust on 10 August 1998.

Although some parts of the church are 14th century, the south aisle is 15th century. A rector was recorded in 1308 and the reconstruction of the church was dedicated in 1336 by Bishop John Grandisson. The building also underwent extensive renovation in the 19th century.

The 2 stage west tower has buttresses on each corner. The ringing stage is reached by a polygonal stair turret on the north side. The tower is surmounted by an octagonal recessed spire.

The interior includes early screens and the moulded octagonal granite font is dated 1662, but the rest of the furnishings, polygonal wooden pulpit and wall tablets are Victorian.

== See also ==
- List of churches preserved by the Churches Conservation Trust in South West England
