= St David's Church, Ashprington =

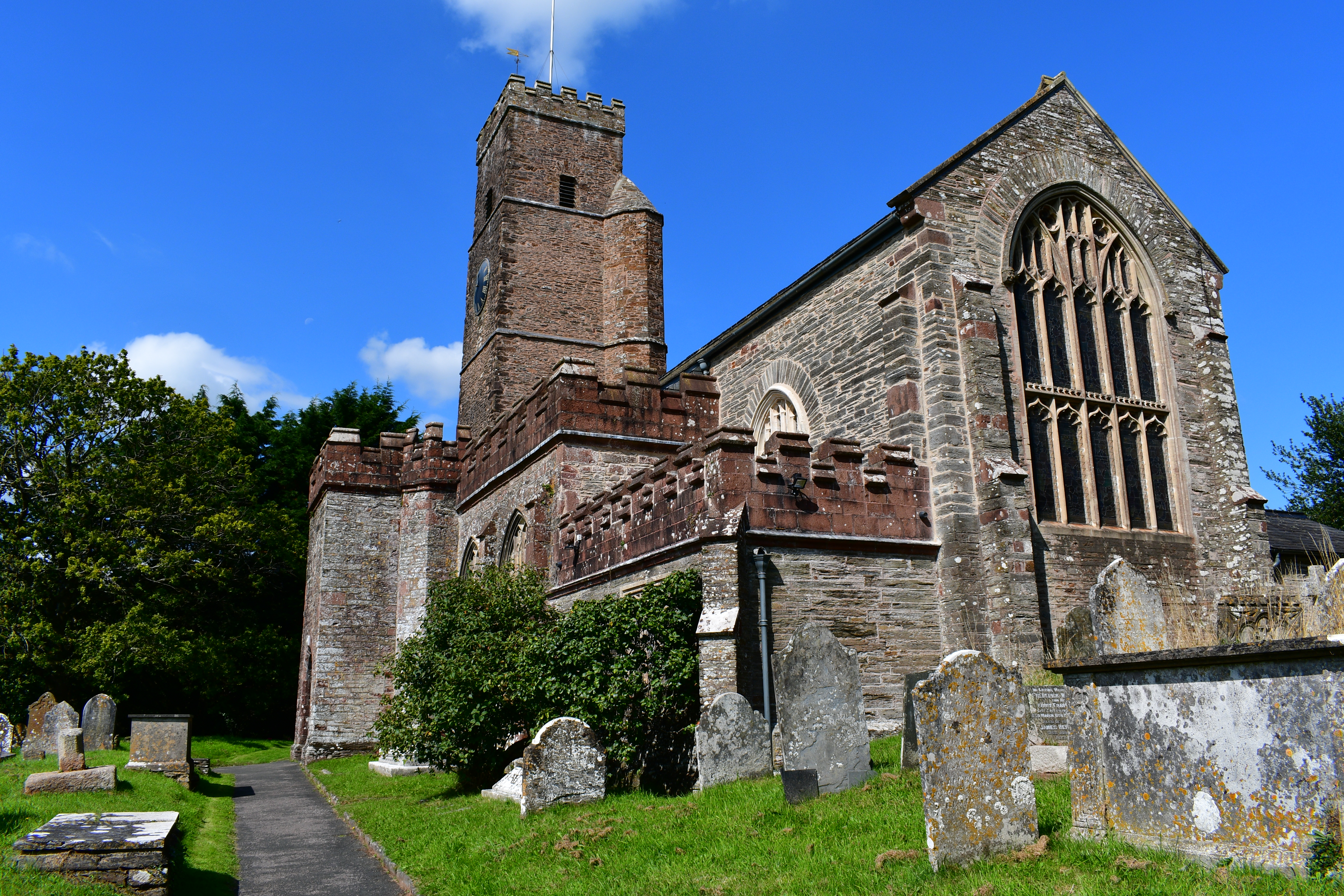
- St David's Church, Ashprington

- 50.40244143101491°N 3.6632447717294148°W,
- OS grid reference: SX8185557151
- Country: England
- Denomination: Church of England
- Website: https://www.ashpringtonchurch.org/

History
- Status: Operational
- Dedication: St David

Architecture
- Heritage designation: Grade I listed
- Style: Gothic
- Years built: 15th century with earlier tower and 19th century restorations

Administration
- Province: Canterbury
- Diocese: Exeter
- Archdeaconry: Exeter
- Parish: Ashprington

Clergy
- Vicar: Revd Jim Barlow

St David's Church in Ashprington, Devon, is a parish church in the Church of England. It is a Grade I listed building.

== Building ==
The original church was Norman, and traces of this remain in the 12th century sandstone font and fragments of a Norman mask reused on the inside of the porch.

Most of the church was rebuilt in the 15th century, except for the tower which is of 13th or 14th century construction. Restorations were carried out in 1845, 1865 (by Thomas Lidstone of Dartmouth), and 1886.

The building is built of local stone rubble with red sandstone dressings and 19th century Bathstone windows.

== Current day ==
The nearest town is Totnes and St David's Church is part of the Totnes Mission Community.

The church is open to the public most days, and is used by a local community choir.
