= Kingswear Castle =

Grade I listed castle in South Hams, UK

- Devon, England
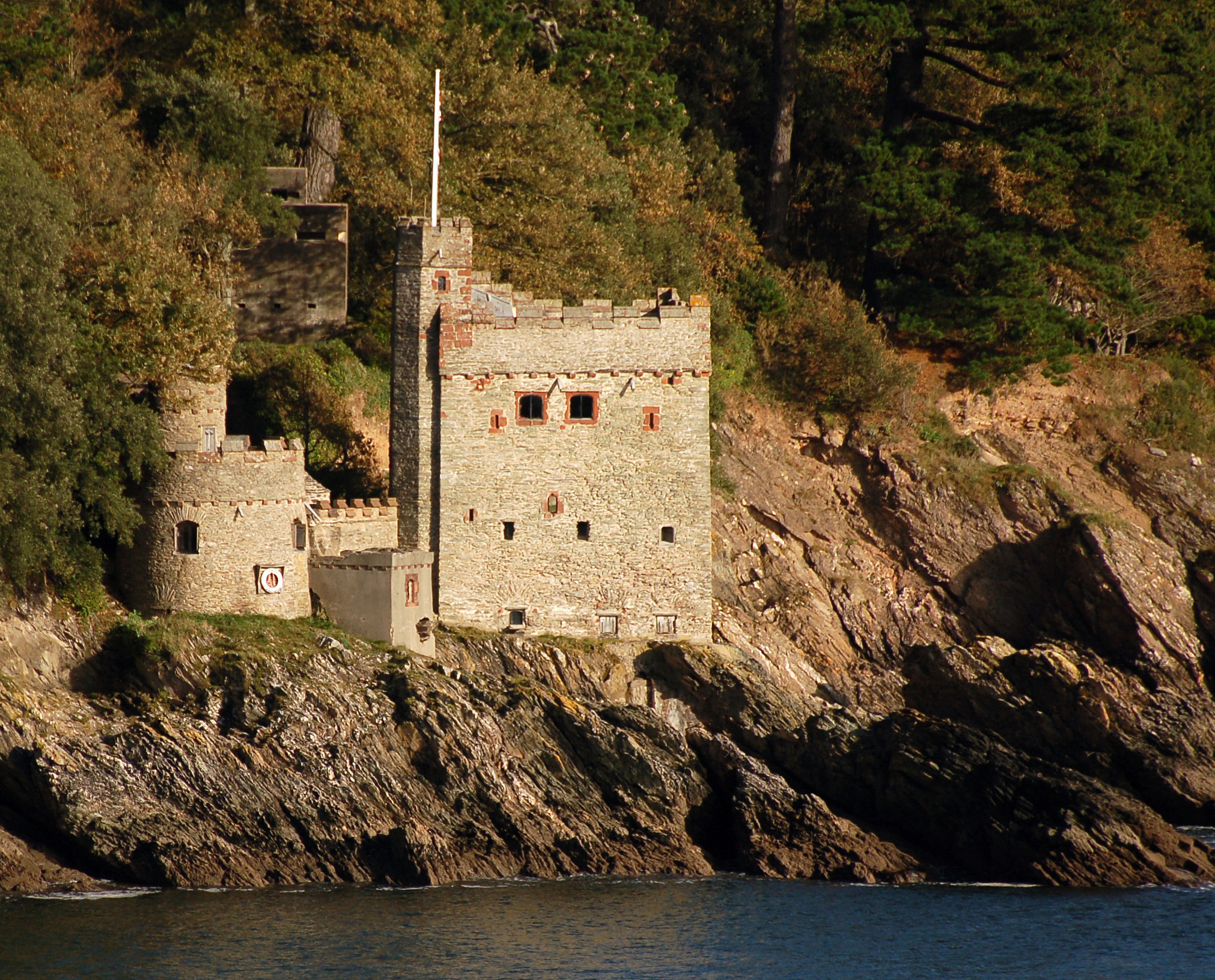
- Kingswear Castle, seen from Dartmouth Castle

Site information
- Type: Artillery tower
- Owner: Landmark Trust
- Open to the public: No
- Condition: Restored

Location
- Shown within Devon
- Coordinates: 50.34125°N 3.55983°W
- Grid reference: grid reference SX891502

Site history
- Materials: Slate rubble
- Events: English Civil War

Kingswear Castle is an artillery fort, built to protect Dartmouth harbour in Devon, England. It was constructed between 1491 and 1502 in response to the threat of French attack and was one of the first purpose-built artillery forts in Britain. By the end of the 16th century, however, improvements in the range of artillery weapons had reduced the utility of the castle. It took part in the English Civil War and continued to be armed until the early 18th century, but fell into ruin. Restored as a summer house in 1855, in the 21st century it is managed by the Landmark Trust as a holiday let.

== History ==
=== 15th–16th centuries ===
Kingswear Castle was built to protect the coastal town of Dartmouth in Devon. In the medieval period, the town's harbour, located in the estuary of the River Dart, was an important trading and fishing port, able to hold up to 600 vessels. Fears of a French invasion, combined with the hope of retaining a valuable royal subsidy, led the town to develop Dartmouth Castle, on the west side of the estuary, into an artillery fort between 1486 and 1495.

Work on Kingswear began in 1491, with the intention of providing protection to the east side of the estuary, and by the time it was completed in 1502 it formed one of the first purpose-built artillery forts in Britain. It took the form of a three-storeyed, square tower built of slate rubble with red sandstone detailing. Its large, rectangular gun-ports with wooden shutters on the ground level matched those at Dartmouth Castle, and looked out close to the water at the entrance to the harbour, covering both the sea and the anchorage itself. The first floor would have also held guns and provided accommodation for the garrison.

In the 1570s, a survey recommended that four brass artillery guns be kept at the castle. The range of artillery guns soon increased, however, making it unnecessary to have armed forts on both sides of the river and, by the end of the 16th century, the castle's military utility had lessened and it was not normally manned.

=== 17th–18th centuries ===
At the outbreak of the Civil War between the supporters of Charles I and those of Parliament in 1642, Dartmouth initially sided with Parliament and the town invested money in Kingswear's castle doors. The following year, Prince Maurice besieged and took the town. An earthwork fort, called Mount Ridley or Kingsworth, may subsequently have been built to protect the vulnerable position behind Kingswear Castle; an alternative supposition is that the fort was first built in 1627 and was simply brought back into use during the conflict. In January 1646, Sir Thomas Fairfax led a Parliamentary army to retake Dartmouth, capturing Kingswear from Sir Henry Cary, the High Sheriff of Devon, who had been left in charge of defending it.

A governor, Sir John Fowell, was appointed to run the local defences, and to prevent smuggling, while Sir Henry was heavily fined by Parliament. By 1661 and the restoration of Charles II to the throne, the guns at Kingswear were mounted on the roof, which had been accidentally burnt down during the fighting in the war and had been replaced with a new lead version. Sir John retained his role as governor and, although Charles briefly reasserted the rights of the town over the defences, control quickly passed to the Crown. By the 18th century, Kingswear had fallen into ruin, although 12-pounder, 9-pounder and 8-pounder (5.4 kg, 4 kg and 3.6 kg) guns were still installed there in 1717.

=== 19th–21st centuries ===
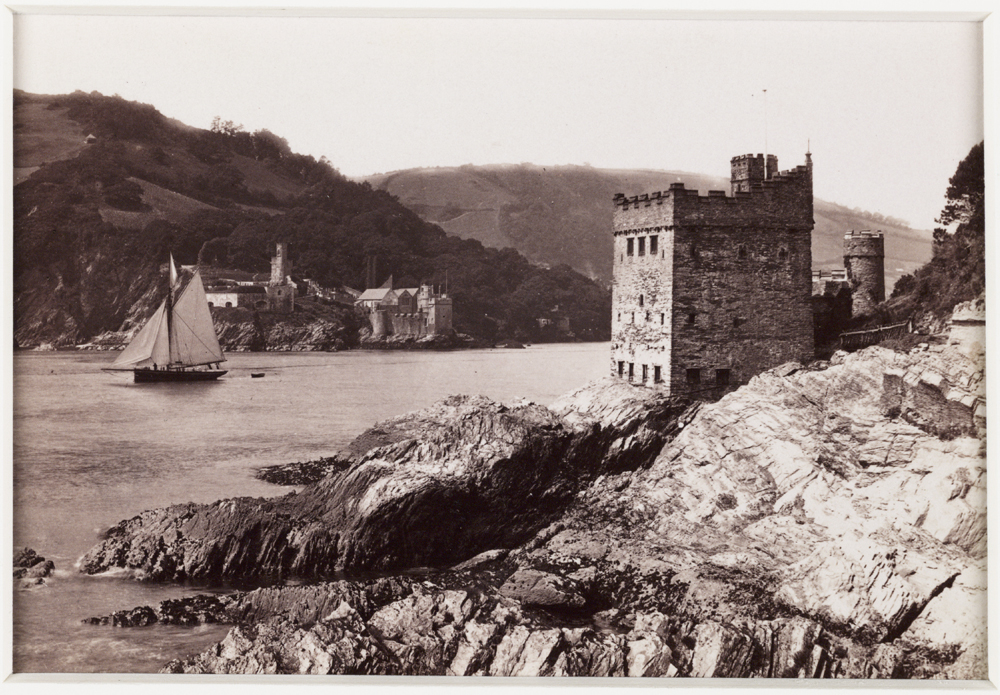
The castle circa 1880, with Dartmouth Castle in the background

In 1855, the businessman Charles Seale Hayne restored Kingswear to form a summer house, using the local architect Thomas Lidstone; the ground floor was redesigned, a conical roof added and a detached round tower constructed on the north-west side. During the Second World War, it was used by the Royal Marines and the site reinforced by a concrete blockhouse. In 1955, the castle was bought by Sir Frederic Bennett, newly elected as Member of Parliament for Torquay (and afterwards for Torbay), who turned it into a private residence and his constituency base. Following his retirement from politics in 1987, Sir Frederic sold the castle to The Landmark Trust who converted it for use as a holiday let, restoring the ground floor of the main building to its original appearance and recreating the earlier flat, lead roof. It is protected under UK law as a Grade I listed building.

== See also ==
- Castles in Great Britain and Ireland
- List of castles in England

== Bibliography ==
- Davison, Brian K. (2000). Dartmouth Castle, Devon. London, UK: English Heritage. ISBN 1850747598.
- Keay, Anna; Stanford, Caroline (2015). Landmark: A History of Britain in 50 Buildings. London, UK: The Landmark Trust. ISBN 978-0711236455.
- O'Neil, B. H. St. John (1936). "Dartmouth Castle and Other Defences of Dartmouth Haven". Archaeologia. 85: 129–159. doi:10.1017/S0261340900015186.
- Saunders, Andrew (1989). Fortress Britain: Artillery Fortifications in the British Isles and Ireland. Liphook, UK: Beaufort. ISBN 1855120003.
- Watkin, Hugh Robert (1920). House of Stuart and the Cary Family, James II and Torre Abbey. Exeter, UK: James G. Commin. OCLC 18898862.
