= Totnes Guildhall =

Municipal building in Totnes, Devon, England

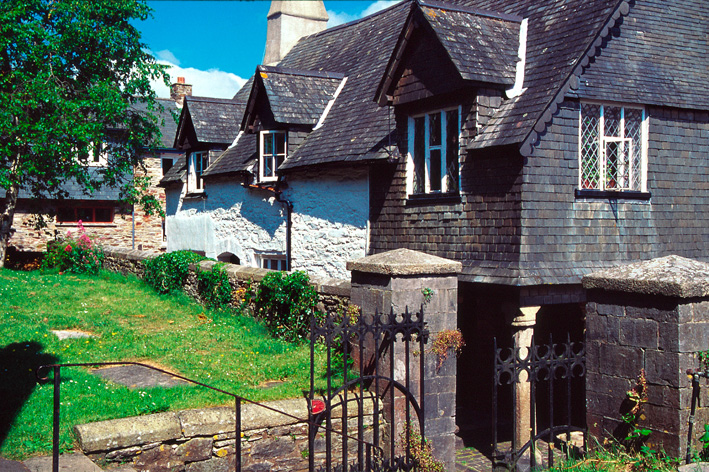
- Guildhall

- Location within Devon
- 50.4321°N 3.6879°W
- Location: Totnes, Devon

History
- Built: 1553

Listed Building – Grade I
- Designated: 7 January 1952
- Reference no.: 1235949

Totnes Guildhall is a 16th-century Tudor historic guildhall, magistrate's court, and prison, in the town of Totnes, south Devon, in southwest England. It is a Grade I listed building.

== History ==
After Totnes was granted a charter by King John enabling the town to makes its own bylaws in 1206, the merchants of the town secured permission to establish a guild and constructed their original guildhall in the High Street. The old guildhall became a place for measuring and stamping cloth in the late 16th century and was then rebuilt as a private residence in 1719.

The current building was originally part of Totnes Priory, which had been established by Juhel de Totnes, feudal baron of Totnes. Following the dissolution of the monasteries by King Henry VIII in the 1540s, his successor, Edward VI, granted Totnes a charter, in 1553, allowing one of the former priory buildings, which had been used as the monks' refectory, to be converted into a guildhall. Part of the first floor of the building was converted for use as a magistrates' court in 1624. Soldiers were billeted in the building during the English Civil War: the council chamber at the west end of the first floor hosted a meeting between Oliver Cromwell and Thomas Fairfax at the oak tables there in 1646.

The lower hall was used as a public meeting room as evidenced by the names of over 600 town mayors, who have served since 1359, listed on its walls. After prison cells had been built in the basement, the building was also used as the town gaol until 1887. The building was extended to the east by the addition of a loggia in front of the original building in 1897: the extension was designed with Doric order columns which had been recovered from the Exchange which had been demolished in 1878.

Queen Elizabeth II, accompanied by the Duke of Edinburgh, visited the guildhall in July 1962. The council chamber continued to be used as the meeting place of the borough of Totnes but ceased to be the local seat of government after the formation of South Hams District Council under the Local Government Act 1972; the magistrates' court continued to be used for court hearings until 1974.

== Current use ==
The building continues to be used by Totnes Town Council for meetings and other ceremonial events. It is also open to the public during weekdays.

== See also ==
- Guild
- Guildhall
