= Rex =

Rex most often refers to:

- Rex (title) (Latin: king, ruler, monarch), a royal title
  - King of Rome (Latin: Rex Romae), chief magistrate of the Roman Kingdom

Rex or REX may also refer to:

== Animals ==
=== Dogs ===
- Rex (Ronald Reagan's dog)
- Rex (search and rescue dog), a dog that received a 1945 Dickin Medal for bravery

=== Other animals ===
- -rex, a taxonomic suffix used to describe certain large animals
  - Tyrannosaurus rex, a large predatory cretaceous dinosaur
- Rex (horse) or Rex the Wonder Horse, star of 15 Hollywood motion pictures
- Rex rabbit, a breed of rabbit
  - Rex mutation, a type of mutation affecting the fur of the rex rabbit
  - One of at least three types of rabbit fur collectively known as "rex fur"
- A category of domestic cat breeds, such as the Devon Rex

== Computing and technology ==
- REX prefix, used by the x86-64 instruction encoding
- Rexx (originally named Rex), a computer programming language
- REX, an audio file format; see REX2
- .rex (disambiguation), file extension used by Rexx scripts and REX2 audio files
- REX 5000, a series of personal digital assistants
- REX 6000, a series of personal digital assistants
- Rex (software), a remote execution, configuration management and software deployment system
- Rex (video game), a 1988 game for the ZX Spectrum and Amstrad CPC
- REX OS, a real-time operating system developed by Qualcomm
- Samsung REX, a series of affordable feature phones
- "request to exit", a push-button or motion detector used for access control, abbreviated "REX"

== Energy and fuels ==
- REX American Resources, an ethanol and gas company
- Rockies Express Pipeline, a natural gas pipeline built across the US
- Rex Energy, a defunct company engaged in natural gas exploration
- Rex International Holding Limited, an oil and gas company headquartered in Singapore

== Fictional characters ==
=== Film ===
- Rex Lewis, a character from G.I. Joe: The Rise of Cobra
- Rex (Toy Story), a toy dinosaur character from Disney/Pixar's Toy Story series
- Rex Motion Picture Company, an early film production company in the US from 1910 into 1917
- Rex (film), alternative name for Megan Leavey, 2017

=== Animated television series ===
- Rex Banner, a one-time character in The Simpsons appearing in the episode "Homer vs. the Eighteenth Amendment"
- Captain Rex, the clone trooper captain who served as General Anakin Skywalker's second-in-command in the series Star Wars: The Clone Wars

=== Live-action television series ===
- Rex Balsom, a character on the soap opera One Life to Live
- Rex Brady, a character on the soap opera Days of Our Lives
- Rex (police dog), a fictional character from the police drama television series Inspector Rex
- Rex (Slovak TV series), a 2017 series based on the Austrian original
- Rex Van de Kamp, a character in the series Desperate Housewives
- Rex Britten, a character in the series Awake

=== Other fiction ===
- Metal Gear REX, a mecha from the video game Metal Gear Solid
- Rex the Wonder Dog, a DC Comics superhero dog
- Rex Morgan, M.D., a comic strip and its title character

== Music ==
- Rex (musical), a stage musical, with music by Richard Rodgers and lyrics by Sheldon Harnick
- Rex (band), an alternative rock band
- Rex (Live at the Fillmore), a 2008 album by Keller Williams, Keith Moseley and Jeff Austin
- Rex Records (disambiguation), several record companies
- Rex Orange County, an English recording artist and songwriter

== People ==
- Rex (given name), for people with the given name
- Rex (surname), for people with the surname
- Rex (artist), American gay pornographic artist
- Rex (singer), Li Xinyi (born 1998), Chinese singer and songwriter
- Mad Dog Rex, professional wrestler from All-Star Wrestling

== Places ==
- Rex, Georgia, an unincorporated community in the US
- Rex, North Carolina, a census-designated place in the US
- Rex River, Washington, US
- Mount Rex, an isolated mountain in Antarctica

== Transportation ==
=== Air ===
- Rex Airlines, an Australian airline
- General Lucio Blanco International Airport in Reynosa, Mexico (IATA airport code REX)
- Reporting name for the Kawanishi N1K Japanese Fighter

=== Land ===
- BMW i3 REx, range extender variant of the all-electric BMW i3
- Subaru Rex, a Japanese Kei car
- Subaru Impreza WRX, a car referred to as "Rex"
- Regional-Express, a train category
- Rex-Acme, a premier British motorcycle company of early 1900s, originally Rex
- Rex (automobile) of Detroit, c. 1914
- Rex-Simplex and Rex, brand names used by the German company Hering & Richard which produced motor vehicles between 1901 and 1923

=== Sea ===
- SS Rex, an Italian luxury ship, sunk by Allied bombers off the coast of Slovenia in 1944
- SS Rex, a floating casino off the coast of Southern California from the late 1930s to the late 1940s, run by mobster Anthony Cornero

== Other uses ==
- Rex (krewe), the Rex Organization, an old-line Mardi Gras krewe
  - Rex, king of the New Orleans Mardi Gras Carnival
- Rex Architecture P.C., an architecture and design firm based in New York City, US
- Rex 84, a plan by the US to test their ability to detain large numbers of American citizens
- Rex (chair), a foldable chair
- Rex, the dinosaur mascot of the Calgary Dinos athletic teams at the University of Calgary
- MP412 REX, a Russian handgun
- REX, the Regents External Degree program, a former name of Excelsior College
- Rex Book Store, an educational book publisher and bookstore chain in the Philippines
- Rex Center, a former building in Lowell, Massachusetts
- Oligosaccharide reducing-end xylanase, an enzyme
- REX (New Horizons), a radio science experiment on the Pluto flyby space probe
- The Rex, Berkhamsted, an English cinema
- The Rex Steakhouse, a Redondo Beach restaurant
- UNC Rex Healthcare, a general hospital in North Carolina

== See also ==
- Port Rex Technical High School, a technical high school in South Africa
- Rex Cinema (disambiguation)
- Rex Theatre (disambiguation)
- Rexist Party, known as Rex, a fascist political movement and ideology in Belgium
- T. rex (disambiguation)
