= Rex (given name) =

- Gender: Male

Origin
- Origin: Latin
- Meaning: King

Other names
- Related names: Regis, Reginald, Rexford, Roy, Renato

Rex is a male given name, short for Rexford or Reginald, derived from the Latin word rex, meaning "king". This is the etymological root word for king in several languages.

== Given name ==
- Rex (artist) (birth name not made public; c.1943–2024), American gay erotic artist
- Rex Addison, Australian architect
- Rex Andrew Alarcon (born 1970), Filipino prelate of the Roman Catholic church
- Rex Alexander (1924–1982), American basketball and tennis coach
- Rex Allen (1920–1999), American actor and singer
- Rex Allen, Jr. (born 1947), American singer and son of the above
- Rex Applegate (1914–1998), American military officer
- Rex Armistead (1930–2013), American private detective
- Rex Babin (1962–2012), American political cartoonist
- Rex Baddeley (born 1941), New Zealand cricketer
- Rex Ballard, American cinematographer
- Rex T. Barber (1917–2001), American fighter pilot
- Rex Barnes (born 1959), Canadian politician
- Rex Barnett (born 1938), American politician, and former officer of the Missouri State Highway Patrol
- Rex Barney (1924–1997), American baseball pitcher and announcer
- Rex Barrat (1914–1974), French artist
- Rex Battarbee (1893–1973), Australian artist
- Rex Baxter (born 1936), American golfer
- Rex Beach (1877–1949), American novelist and playwright
- Rex Bell (1903–1962), American actor and politician
- Rex M. Best, American soap opera writer
- Rex Brandt (1914–2000), American artist and educator
- Rex Brasher (1869–1960), American painter
- Rex Briggs (born 1971), American author, analyst and researcher
- Rex Brothers (born 1987), American baseball player
- Rex Brown (born 1964), bassist of heavy metal band Pantera
- Rex Burkhead (born 1990), American football player
- Rex Caldwell (born 1950), American golfer
- Rex Carroll, American guitarist
- Rex L. Carter (1925–2014), American lawyer and politician
- Rex Cauble (1913–2003), American banker, businessman, rancher and real estate agent
- Rex Cecil (1916–1966), American baseball player
- Rex Chapman (born 1967), American basketball player
- Rex Chikoko, Malawian investigative journalist and media analyst
- Rex Clark (1935–1978), Australian army officer
- Rex Cherryman (1897–1928), American stage and screen actor
- Rex Vicat Cole (1870–1940), English painter
- Rex Collinge (born 1935), English first-class cricketer and Royal Air Force officer
- Rex Connor (1907–1977), Australian politician
- Rex Cramphorn (1941–1991), Australian theatre director, costume designer, theatre critic, theorist and translator
- Rex Crawford (1932–2022), Canadian farmer and politician
- Rex M. Cunningham (1907–1969), American politician and World War II veteran
- Rex Davis (1890–1951), English soldier, silent film actor and sportsman
- Rex D. Davis (1924–2008), American federal law enforcement officer
- Rex Dallas (born 1938), Australian country musician, singer, songwriter, yodeler and bush balladeer
- Rex Damschroder (born 1950), American politician
- Rex De Garis (1896–1967), Australian footballer
- Rex de Silva (1918–2005), Ceylonese aviator
- Rex Dockery (1942–1983), American football player and coach
- Rex Downing (1925–2020), American child actor
- Rex Eisen né Tod Rex Salvador, ex-guitarist of Murderdolls, Static-X and Dope
- Rex Ellsworth (1907–1997), American Thoroughbred racehorse breeder
- Rex Enright (1901–1960), American football and basketball player, coach and college athletics administrator
- Rex Everhart (1920–2000), American actor
- Rex Fell (1944/1945–2016), New Zealand thoroughbred horse breeder
- Rex Forehand (born 1945), American psychologist
- Rex Forrester (1928–2001), New Zealand hunting and fishing specialist
- Rex Frederick (born 1936), American basketball coach and player
- Rex Garrod (1943–2019), English inventor and roboteer
- Rex Garvin (1940–2013), American instrumentalist and singer-songwriter
- Rex Gatchalian (born 1979), Filipino politician
- Rex Geard (1927–1982), Australian footballer
- Rex Geveden (born 1962), American businessman, CEO of BWX Technologies
- Rex Gibson (1932–2005), English academic writer
- Rex Gildo (1939–1999), German singer
- Rex Goh (born 1951), Singaporean-Australian guitarist
- Rex Goreleigh (1902–1986), American painter, educator
- Rex Goudie (born 1985), Canadian singer and 2005 Canadian Idol runner-up
- Rex Griffin (1912–1959), American singer-songwriter
- Rex Grossman (born 1980), American football player
- Rex Grossman Sr. (1924–1980), American football player
- Rex Hadnot (born 1982), American football player
- Rex Harrison (1908–1990), British actor
- Rex Hartwig (1929–2022), Australian tennis player
- Rex Harvey (1946–2019), American decathlete and engineer
- Rex Hazlewood (disambiguation), several people, including
  - Rex Hazlewood (1903–1985), British official of The Scout Association
- Rex Hillier (born 1956), Canadian politician
- Rex Hobcroft (1925–2013), Australian pianist and music administrator
- Rex Hudler (born 1960), American baseball player
- Rex Hughes, American basketball coach
- Rex Humbard (1919–2007), American television evangelist
- Rex Hunt (born 1949), Australian television and radio personality and former football player
- Rex Hunt (diplomat) (1926–2012), British diplomat, Governor of the Falkland Islands from 1980 to 1985
- Rex Ingamells (1913–1955), Australian poet
- Rex Ingram (actor) (1895–1969), American actor
- Rex Ingram (director) (1893–1950), Irish film director
- Rex Jackson (1928–2011), Australian politician
- Rex Jameson (1924–1983), English comedian and drag queen
- Rex Lee Jim (born 1962), Native American politician
- Rex Job (1910–1999), Australian footballer
- Rex Johns (1935–2009), Australian footballer
- Rex Johnston (1937–2019), American baseball player
- Rex Jung, American psychologist
- Rex Kalamian, American basketball coach
- Rex Keeling (1943–2010), American football player
- Rex Kern (born 1949), American football player
- Rex Kieffer Jr. (1929–2001), American politician
- Rex Kilpatrick (1881–1955), American football player and investment banker
- Rex King-Clark (1913–2007), English soldier, pilot, racer, photographer, author, and diarist
- Rex Kirton, New Zealand politician
- Rex Kodippili (1938–2023), Sri Lankan film actor and producer
- Rex Lassalle (born 1945), Trinidadian alternative medicine practitioner and former lieutenant
- Rex Lawson (1938–1971), Nigerian singer, trumpeter and bandleader
- Rex Layne (1928–2000), American heavyweight boxer
- Rex Lease (1903–1966), American actor
- Rex Lee (actor) (born 1969), American actor
- Rex E. Lee (born 1935), American lawyer
- H. Rex Lee (1910–2001), American politician
- Rex Lewis-Clack (born 1995), American pianist and musical prodigy
- Rex Liddy (born 1992), Australian football player
- Rex Linn (born 1956), American actor
- Rex Makin (1925–2017), English solicitor and philanthropist from Liverpool
- Rex Marshall (1919–1983), American actor, television announcer and radio personality
- Rex Distin Martienssen (1905–1942), South African architect
- Rex Mason (1885–1975), New Zealand politician
- Rex Maughan (1936–2021), the founder, president and CEO of Forever Living Products and Terry Labs
- Rex McCandless (1915–1992), Northern Irish motorcycle racer
- Rex McDougall (1878–1933), English stage and film actor
- Rex McGill (born 1949), New Zealand cricketer
- Rex Morgan (basketball) (1948–2016), American basketball player
- Rex Henry Morgan, Australian academic
- Rex Mossop (1928–2011), Australian rugby player
- Rex Murphy (1947–2024), Canadian commentator
- Rex Nan Kivell (1898–1977), New Zealand-born British art collector
- Rex Navarrete (born 1969), Filipino American comedian
- Rex Neame (1936–2008), English cricketer and brewer
- Rex Nelon (1932–2000), American southern gospel musician
- Rex Nelson, American college sports broadcaster, columnist, reporter, author, political appointee and chronicler of Arkansas history
- Rex Nettleford (1933–2010), Jamaican scholar
- Rex Newmark (born 1984), British television personality
- Rex Norris (American football) (born 1939), American football player and coach
- Rex Norris (field hockey) (1899–1980), Indian field hockey player
- Rex Nutting, American journalist, economist and columnist
- Rex Ogle, American author
- Rex O'Malley (1901–1976), English actor
- Rex Omar, Ghanaian musician
- Rex Orr (1923–2011), New Zealand rugby player
- Rex Paterson (1902–1978), British agriculturalist
- Rex Patrick (born 1967), Australian politician
- Rex Patterson (1927–2016), Australian politician
- Rex Paul (born 1945), real name of Guyanese-born American radio journalist Kojo Nnamdi
- Rex Pemberton (born 1983), Australian extreme sport athlete and motivational speaker
- Rex R. Perschbacher (1946–2018), American law professor
- Rex Piano, American film director, screenwriter, TV actor and producer
- Rex Pickett, American novelist and filmmaker
- Rex Pierson (1891–1948), English aircraft designer
- Rex Pilbeam (1907–1999), Australian politician
- Rex Rabanye (1944–2010), South African jazz fusion and soulful pop musician
- Rex Rammell (born 1961), American politician and veterinarian
- Rex Ray (1956–2015), American graphic designer
- Rex Reason (1928–2015), American actor
- Rex Reed (1938–2026), American film critic, journalist, actor and media personality
- Rex Richardson (born 1983), American politician
- Rex Ritchie (1914–2006), Australian rules footballer
- Rex Rienits (1909–1971), Australian writer
- Rex M. Rogers (born 1952), American author, broadcaster and televangelist
- Rex Rudicel (1912–2000), American basketball player
- Rex Ryan (born 1962), American football coach
- Rex Salas (born 1962), American record producer, songwriter, musical director and music arranger
- Rex Sanders (1922–2017), English military aviator
- Rex Shelley (1930–2009), Singaporean author
- Rex Sinquefield (born 1944), American businessman, investor and philanthropist
- Rex Slinkard (1887–1918), American painter and teacher
- Rex Smith (born 1955), American actor and singer
- Rex Smith (American football) (1896–1972), American football player
- Rex Smith (baseball) (1864–1895), American baseball player
- Rex Smith (politician) (born 1957), American politician
- Rex Wakely Smith (1930–2013), South African rally driver and philatelist
- Rex Solomon (born 1966), American jewelry store owner and former capella directory publisher
- Rex Stewart (1907–1967), American jazz cornetist
- Rex Stout (1886–1975), American author
- Rex Taylor (1889–1968), American screenwriter
- Rex Terp (born 1970), Australian rugby player
- Rex Terry (1888–1964), American banker and politician
- Rex Tillerson (born 1952), 69th United States Secretary of State
- Rex Tilley (1929–2016), English footballer
- Rex Townley (1904–1982), Australian politician
- Rex Trailer (1928–2013), American television personality, broadcast pioneer, cowboy and Country and Western recording artist
- Rex Tremlett (1903–1986), British-South African mining engineer and journalist
- Rex Tso (born 1987), Hong Kong super-flyweight boxer
- Rex Tucker (1913–1996), British television director in the 1950s and 1960s
- Rex Tucker (American football) (born 1976), American football player
- Rex Varghese, Indian bodybuilder
- Rex Vijayan (born 1983), Indian composer, guitarist, singer, record producer and multi-instrumentalist
- Rex A. Wade (born 1936), American historian and author
- Rex Wailes (1901–1986), English engineer and historian on aspects of engineering history
- Rex Walheim (born 1962), American astronaut
- Rex E. Wallace (born 1952), American linguist and classical scholar
- Rex Walters (born 1970), American basketball player and coach
- Rex Warner (1905–1986), English classicist, writer and translator
- Rex Weyler (born 1947), American-Canadian author, journalist and ecologist
- Rex Whistler (1905–1944), English painter, designer and illustrator
- Rex White (born 1929), American race car driver
- Rex Marion Whitton (1898–1981), American federal highway administrator
- Rex Williams (born 1933), English billiards and snooker player
- Rex Williams (American football) (1918–2007), American football player
- Rex Williams (politician) (1928–2012), Australian politician
- Rex Willis (1924–2000), Welsh rugby player
- Rex Wilson (director) (1873–1951), British film director
- Rex Wilson (politician), Member of the New Mexico Senate
- Rex Wilson (runner) (born 1960), New Zealand long-distance runner
- Rex Winsbury (1935–2015), English journalist and author
- Rex Yeatman (1919–1995), English cricketer
- Rex Yetman (1933–2009), Canadian musician
- Rex Ziak, American writer, historian, tour guide and documentarian

== Fictional characters ==
- Rex, from Toy Story
- Rex Dangervest, from The Lego Movie 2: The Second Part
- Rex, the titular character from the British claymation show Rex the Runt
- Rex, the villain from the Canadian animated show Wild Kratts

== See also ==
- Rex (disambiguation)
- Rex (surname)
