= Emily Sweeney =

Emily Sweeney may refer to:

- Emily Sweeney (The Big Bang Theory)
- Emily Sweeney (journalist)
- Emily Sweeney (luger)
