= Egerton House, Berkhamsted =

English country house in Berkhamsted

Egerton House
- Egerton House, c. 1936
- Interactive map of the Egerton House area

General information
- Type: English country house
- Architectural style: Elizabethan
- Location: High Street, Berkhamsted, England, United Kingdom
- Coordinates: 51.7588°N 0.5604°W
- Completed: mid-16th Century
- Demolished: 1937

Egerton House was a small Elizabethan mansion which stood on the High Street in the town of Berkhamsted, Hertfordshire in England. Built during the reign of Queen Elizabeth I, it was demolished in 1937 and the site is now occupied by the Art Deco Rex Cinema. As well as its architectural merit, Egerton House was noted for its occupancy by the Llewelyn Davies family and its literary association with J. M. Barrie, author of Peter Pan.

== Architecture ==
Egerton House was a two-storey mansion with attics. The front of the house had three gables with two smaller gabled dormer windows in between the gables in the steep tiled roof. When the house was sold at an auction held in the King's Arms Hotel in 1895, it recorded that the property afforded three sitting rooms, a dining room, a billiards room, a conservatory, four bedrooms, four box rooms and stables. The sale also mentioned a coach house on Rectory Lane and Egerton Cottage, a gardener's cottage.

The garden was extensive, containing an orchard and stretched as far as the Ashlyns estate. Part of this land was later acquired for the Three Close Lane Cemetery.

== History ==
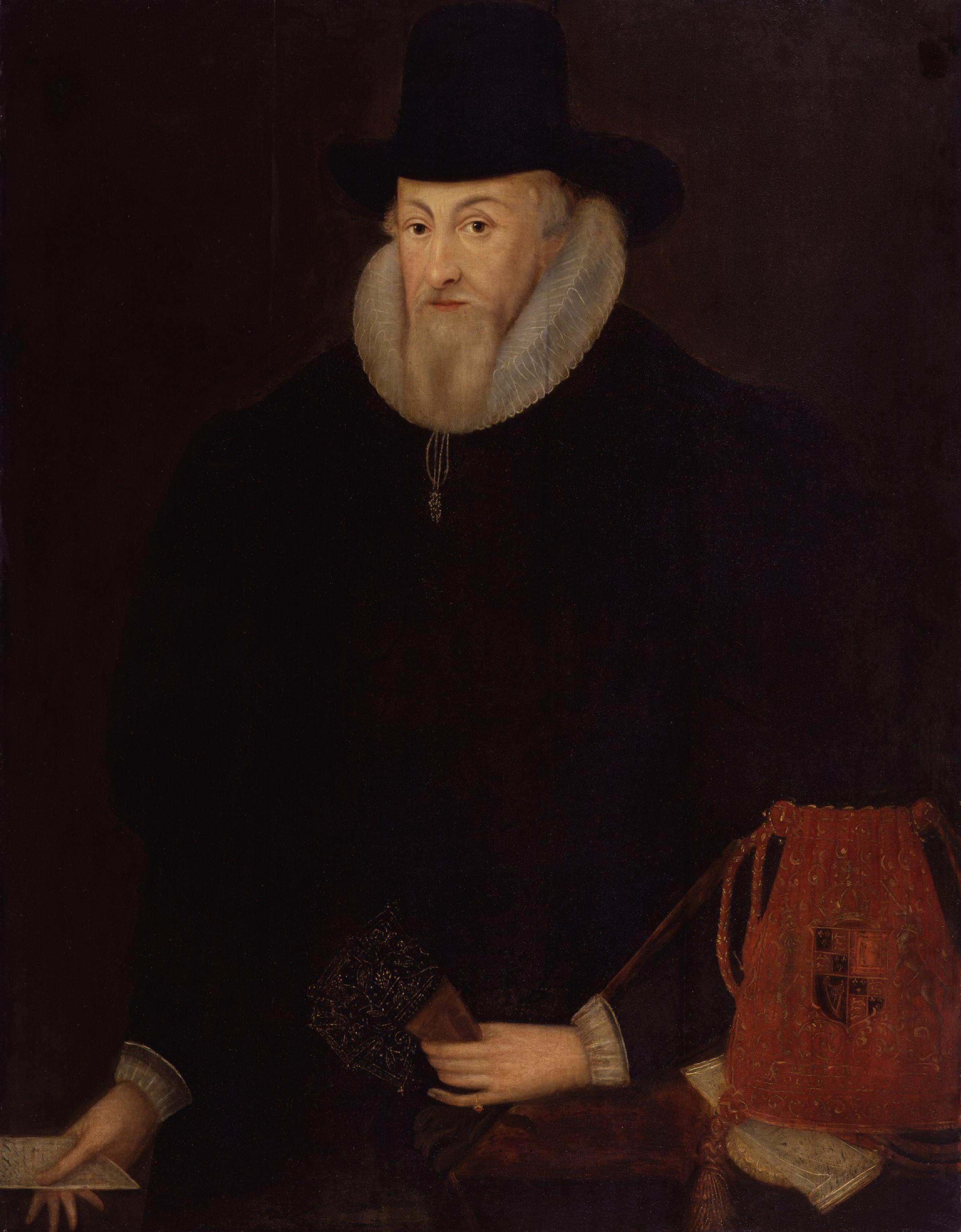
Thomas Egerton (National Portrait Gallery, London).

Egerton House was one of two Elizabethan mansions in Berkhamsted, the other being Berkhamsted Place, located approximately 1 mile (1.6 km) north near to Berkhamsted Castle; both mansions were demolished during the 20th Century.

The site of Egerton House is thought to have previously been the site of St Clement's Hospital, a medieval hospital. Cobb records that a seal inscribed with the name of the Fraternity of St Clement (later the Worshipful Company of Founders) was discovered in the garden behind Egerton House.

No exact date is known for the construction of Egerton House, nor is it known how it acquired its name, although it seems likely that its early owners were members of the Egerton family, possibly Thomas Egerton, whose descendants were later Earls of Bridgewater. It is known that by 1627 the house was the property of Edward Kellet, a local property owner. It was later owned, along with Harriots End Farm, by Rev Dr Robert Brabant who was rector of the Church of St Peter, Great Berkhamsted. Land documents survive which record that a Mr Lyttleton of Egerton House paid eight shillings for the orchard.

In 1840, Egerton House was bought for £700 by Wesleyan Methodists who opened it as a preaching house in 1841. The Methodists sold the house in 1846 for the same sum to Dr Thomas Whately who lived there until he died in 1868. The house was auctioned in 1895, and then purchased in 1904 by the Llewellyn Davies family.

=== The Llewelyn Davies family ===
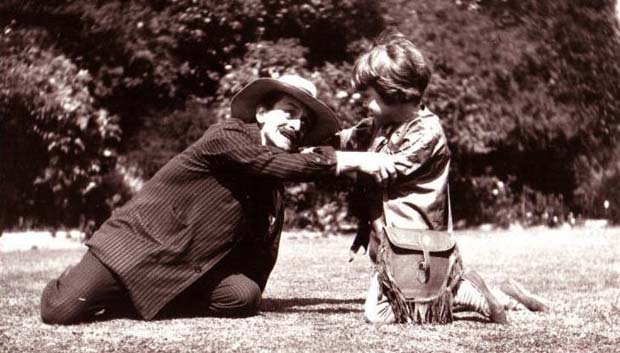
J. M. Barrie (as Hook) playing with Michael (as Peter Pan) in 1906

London barrister Arthur Llewelyn Davies and his wife Sylvia moved with their five sons in 1904 from Kensington Park Gardens in London to live in Egerton House. By this time, the family had become close friends with the Scottish author and playwright J.M. Barrie, who had based his Peter Pan on stories he had made up for the children while they lived in Kensington (the character of Peter Pan was based on the boys but named after Peter Llewelyn Davies). Barrie's play, Peter Pan, or The Boy Who Wouldn't Grow Up, debuted at London's Duke of York's Theatre in the same year.

A visiting friend of the family described Egerton House as "a beautiful Elizabethan house - huge nurseries & a schoolroom with mullioned windows which occupy the whole length of the rooms - odd-shaped bedrooms with beams & sloping floors". Reference was also made to "the beautiful Hall with its huge windows & great 16th century chimney piece".

During their three years in Berkhamsted, Barrie visited the Llewelyn Davies family frequently. Arthur developed cancer and during his illness, Barrie helped support the family financially. When Arthur died at Egerton House in 1907, Sylvia returned to London with her children; when she herself died of cancer in 1910, Barrie became the children's guardian.

=== Demolition ===
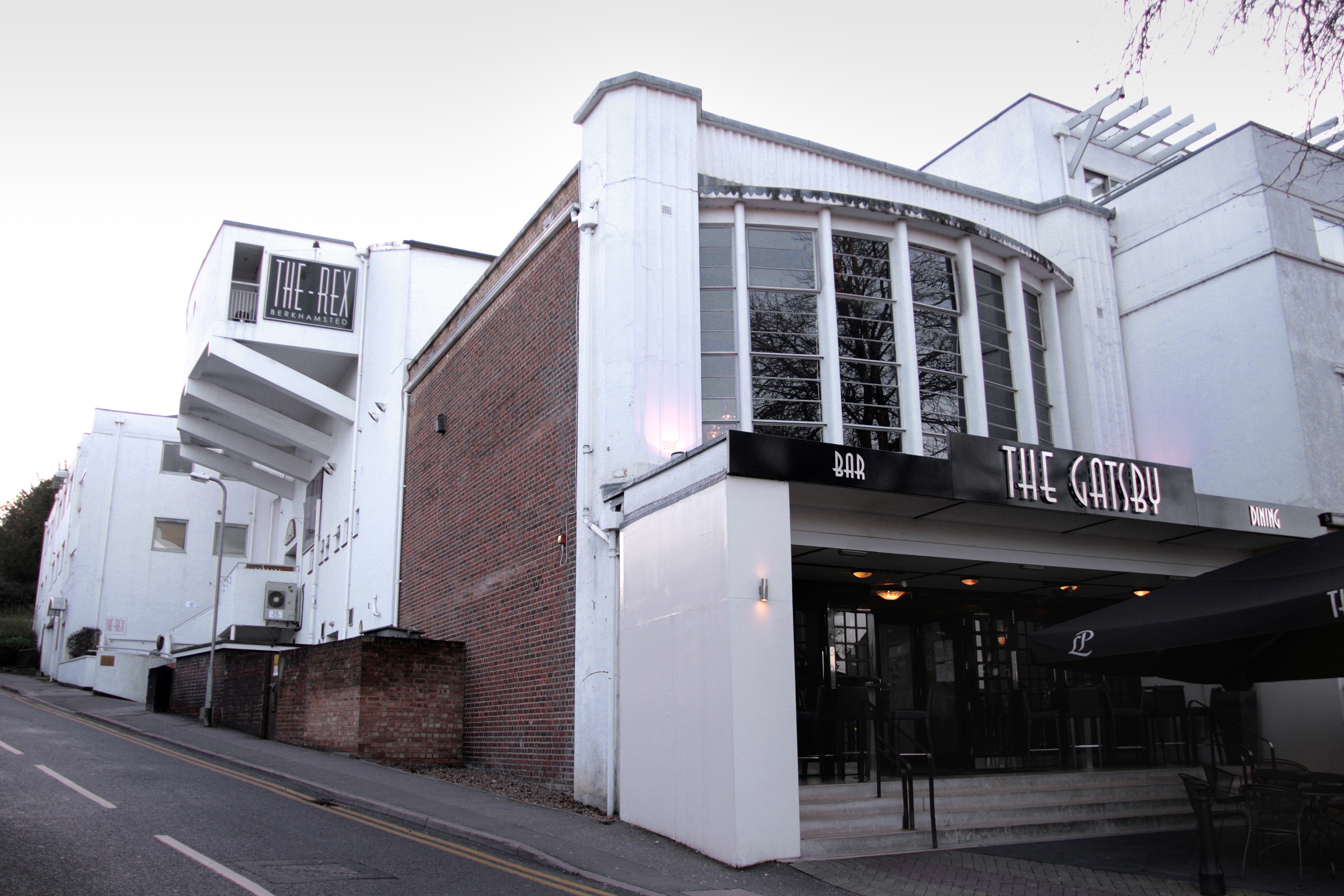
The Rex Cinema, as seen in 2011

The Shipman & King cinema circuit took ownership of the Court Cinema on Berkhamsted High Street, and planned to open a second cinema in the town. Originally they intended to build on a site at the eastern end of town on the corner of Swing Gate Lane, but in 1936 S&K acquired Egerton House, a site closer to the centre of town which had spacious grounds for a cinema and car park. Egerton House was demolished and the Rex Cinema was erected in its place. Some of the interior oak panelling from Egerton House was saved prior to the demolition and was installed in a house called Four Oaks on Graemsdyke Road, and some other panels went into Boxwell House, the office of the Berkhamsted (sic) Rural District Council.

The Rex Cinema was designed in a striking Art Deco style architect David Evelyn Nye and opened in 1938 by Viscountess Davidson.

In 1953, Peter Llewelyn Davies wrote of a visit to Berkhamsted in a letter, lamenting the loss of his childhood home:

Oh dear oh dear, I passed through Berkhampstead the other day and it was almost more than I could bear to see that horrible cinema on the site of dear Egerton House, and the lovely garden turned into a loathsome concrete car park.

The Rex Cinema still stands on the site today and has been listed Grade II by English Heritage. A plaque inside the cinema, unveiled on 14 February 1979 by actress Jane Asher, commemorates the site's association with J.M. Barrie and Peter Pan.
