= Dropkick Murphy =

Dropkick Murphy can refer to:

- John Murphy (sanatorium operator) (1912–1977), professional wrestler nicknamed "Dropkick Murphy", operator of the Bellows Farm Sanatorium
- Dropkick Murphys, a band named after Murphy
