= Embassy Theatre, Peterborough =

Building in Peterborough, England

Coordinates: 52.57533°N 0.24120°W

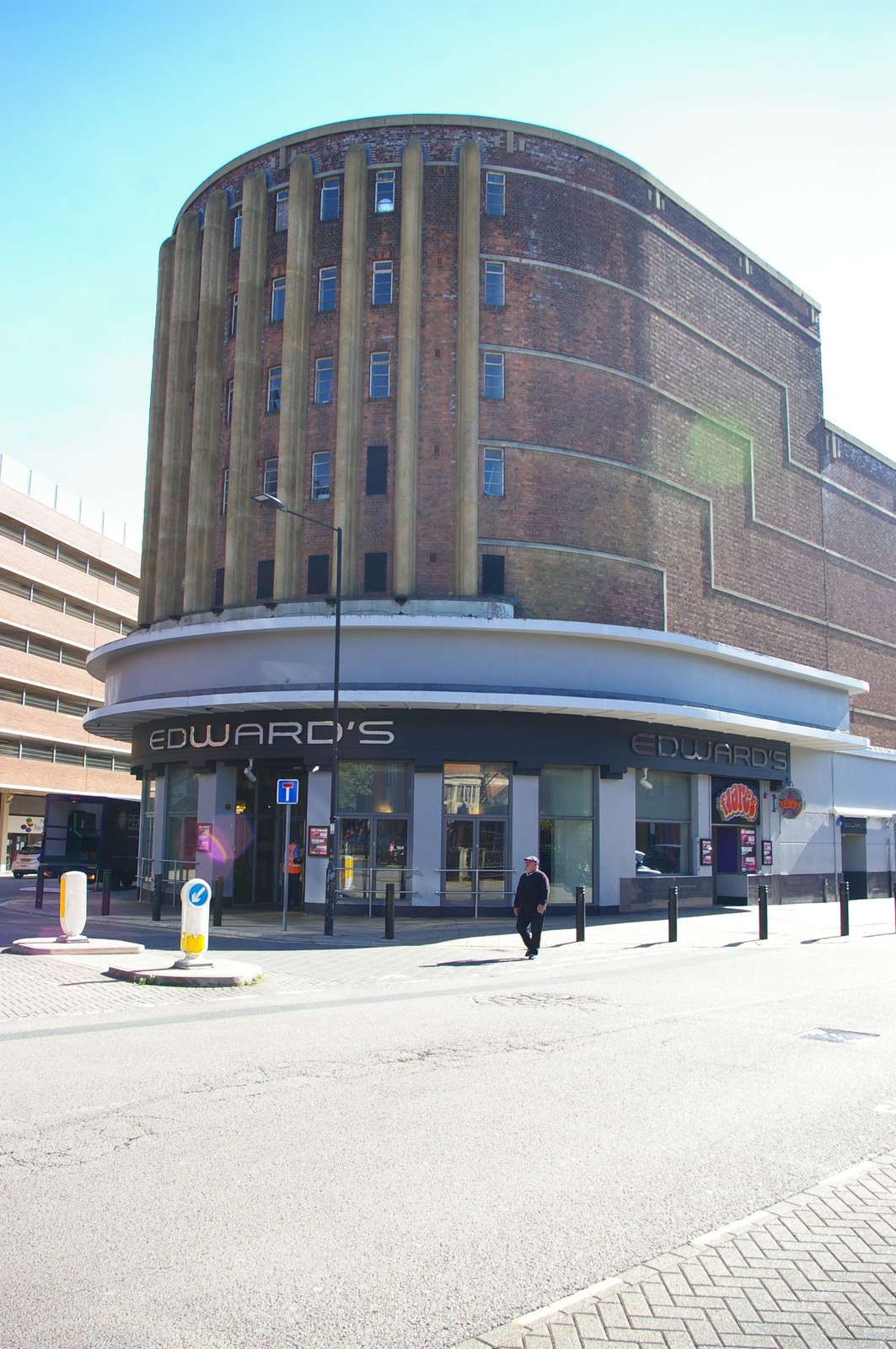
The Embassy Theatre

The Embassy Theatre is a historic structure on Broadway in the city of Peterborough in the United Kingdom, which operated as a cinema from 1953 to 1989.

== History ==
The Embassy Theatre was designed by David Evelyn Nye in the Art Deco style and built by The Demolition & Construction Co. of Croydon using the locally produced Fletton bricks. It opened in 1937, putting on performances by well-known performers such as Laurel and Hardy.

The Beatles performed at the theatre in December 1962 and March 1963. Their 1962 performance was not well received by the crowds but their 1963 performance was much more successful. They were due to play in the theatre on the 10 February 1963 but could not attend as they were traveling to EMI Studios (later renamed Abbey Road Studios) to record the bulk of their first album the next day. They were replaced by Peter Jay and the Jaywalkers for the performance. Their performances were honoured with a mural in 2025.

Nye was usually a cinema architect, and this was his only theatre. However, the building was converted into a cinema in 1953, later becoming the ABC and finally Cannon Cinema. It tripled in size in 1981, before finally closing in 1989. Since 1996, part of the premises have been occupied by the Edwards bar chain.
