= St Mark's Church, Bromley =

Anglican parish church in England

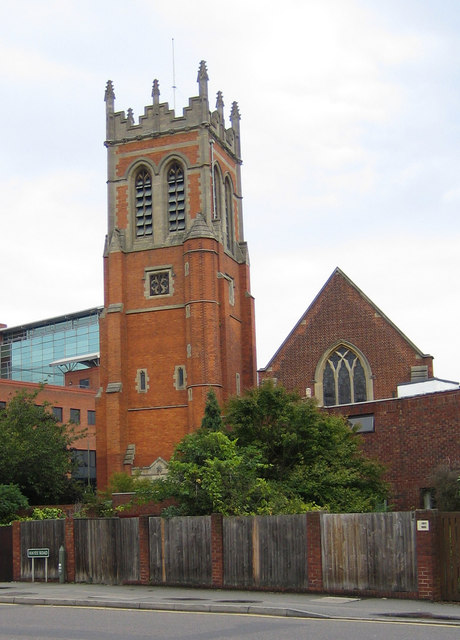
- St Mark's Church, Bromley
- 51.39837°N 0.01586°E
- OS grid reference: TQ 40329 68520
- Country: England
- Denomination: Church of England
- Website: www.stmarksbromley.org.uk

Architecture
- Architect: Evelyn Hellicar
- Years built: 1895-1898

Administration
- Diocese: Rochester
- Archdeaconry: Bromley and Bexley
- Deanery: Bromley
- Parish: St Mark's Bromley

Clergy
- Vicar: Reverend Canon Victoria Pask

St Mark's Church, Bromley is a Church of England parish church in Bromley. It is located on Westmoreland Road, to the south of the town centre. It is part of the Diocese of Rochester.

== History ==
=== Beginnings ===
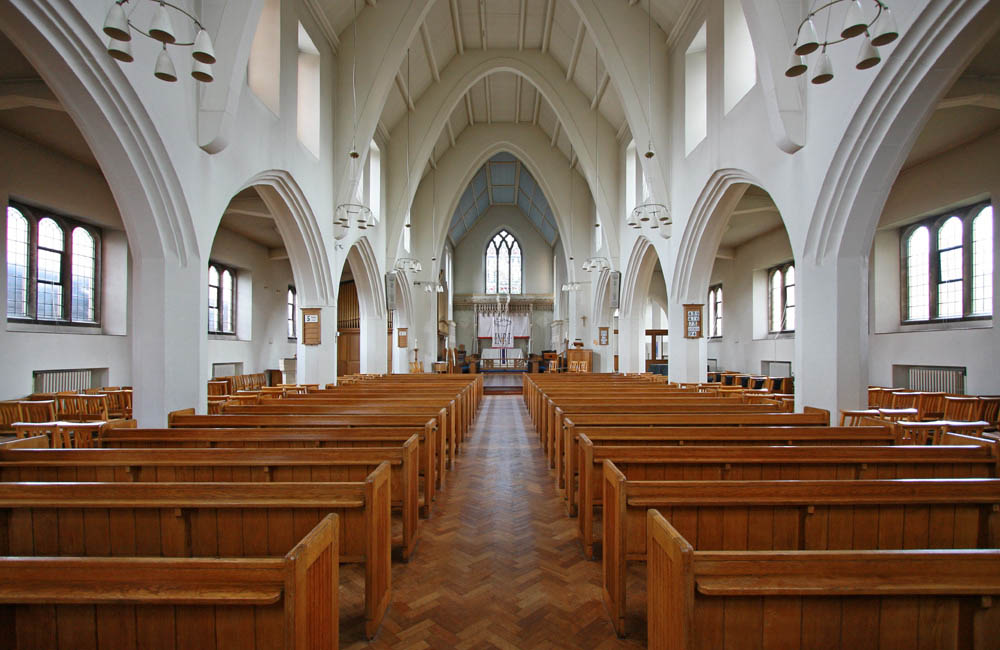
Interior

In the 1880s there was already a worshipping congregation in the Bromley South area, and there had been talk for some years of building a local church. In 1884, the then vicar of St Peter and St Paul, Bromley, Reverend A. G. Hellicar, had received the gift from Samuel Cawston, a local man, of an iron church with furniture and fittings. This church formerly stood at Addison Road, Bromley Common. It was re-erected in what is now St Mark's Road, Masons Hill, on a site kindly lent by Eley Soames, and served as a place of worship until 1898. In 1891 the Bromley Record wrote, ‘It is possible that a fund will be started to replace the iron structure in which the congregation of St Mark’s has been worshipping for the past five years’.

In 1897 the decision was made. The site at the foot of Westmorland Road was purchased by Thomas Dewey and Eley Soames for £500. In 1896 a meeting was held at South Hill Wood, Mr Dewey's house in Westmorland Road, when the plans of the architect, Evelyn Hellicar, son of the Vicar of Bromley, were approved.

On Saturday 22 October 1898 the new church was consecrated by Dr William Walsh, Suffragan Bishop of Dover, accompanied by Canon Murray, the Rural Dean, as Chaplain, and Sir John Hassard, KCB, Registrar of the Diocese of Canterbury. On the Sunday evening the church was so crowded that many worshippers could not gain admittance. Only the bottom part of the tower was built originally, housing the main porch. The tower was raised to its full height in 1903, and dedicated on 10 January 1904. It was built of brick, faced with red bricks from Dunton Green, and decorated with Doulting stone from Shepton Mallet in Somerset.

=== Damage in the Second World War ===
On Wednesday 16 April 1941, Bromley suffered a violent air raid attack. This started in the evening and went on into the early hours. A local report says:

Many public buildings and shops besides private houses were seriously injured or destroyed; amongst the latter, both the Mother and Daughter Churches, viz. St Peter and St Paul’s and St Mark’s. The Church was struck apparently by a combination of incendiary and high explosive bombs. There was a serious fire in the South-West corner of the Church and garden and just inside the main entrance from the Porch. The whole of the Nave and North and South aisles were unroofed. The gallery was fallen, the font in situ but badly broken, the War Memorial Board broken and displaced. All window glass was destroyed and much of the stonework of the apertures broken. The pulpit and pitch pine seats were broken or covered with wreckage from fallen timbers. The East and West windows had their stone and brickwork broken, smashed and forced outwards on to the garden turf. In the Chancel much of the carved reredos and the Holy Table were in situ, slightly damaged. The organ was quite destroyed.

Some of the salvaged articles were taken to St Mark's Church Hall. The reredos was protected by tarpaulins. Only the tower was left undamaged.

=== Rebuilding ===
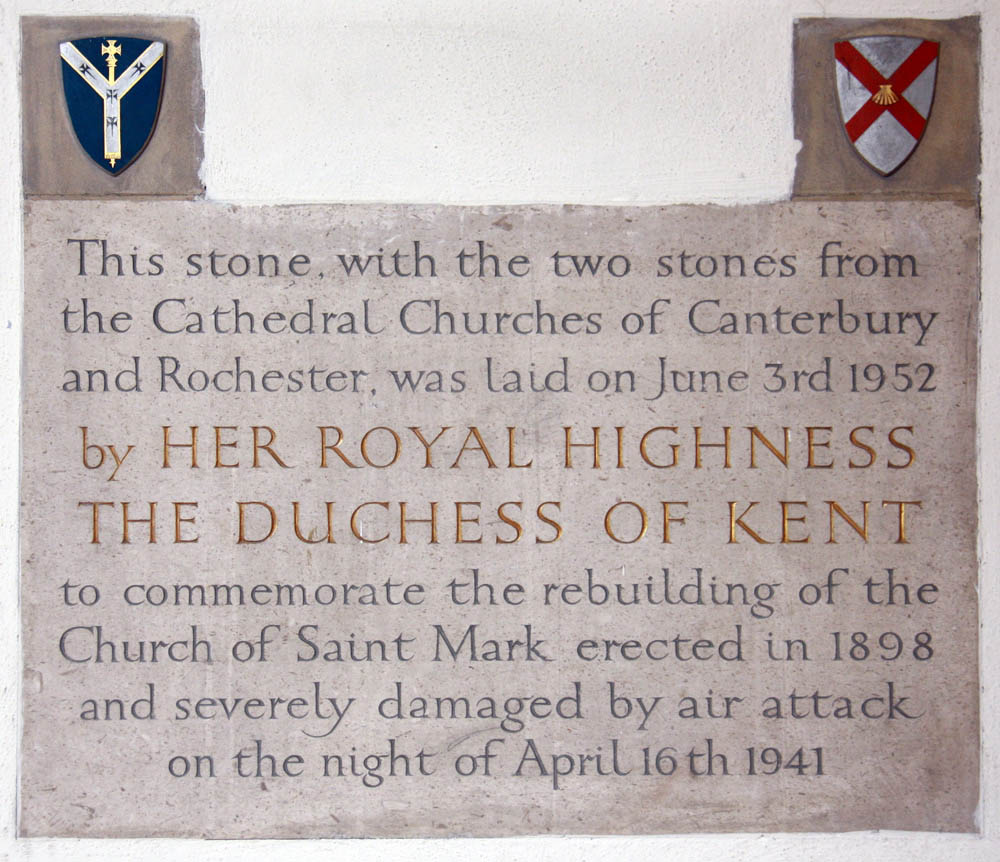
The foundation stone

An annual service was held in the bombed-out church, symbolising the intention to rebuild.

The new church was designed by T. W. G. Grant and built by David Nye and Partners. The original foundations were reused, preserving the previous dimensions and shape, and the nave arcades were incorporated into the new structure. The lower part of the chancel arch was also saved, along with the Victorian carved capitals, the choir stalls and sedilia. On 3 June 1952 HRH The Duchess of Kent laid the corner stone for the reconstruction, and in 1953 St Mark's was rededicated by the Bishop of Rochester, Dr Christopher Chavasse, in presence of the Vicar, Reverend H. J. A. Edwards.

== The church today ==
The present church incorporates the original tower and much of the brick and fragments of the late Victorian building. The interior is a mixture of styles, with the parabolic arches favoured by Grant contrasting uneasily with the Perpendicular shapes of Hellicar. The reredos and choir stalls survive from before the war; the original baptismal font was accidentally broken during the war and the present one is a 1950s replacement, as are the pipe organ (designed by Rushworth and Dreaper) and lectern.
