= Antero Resources =

American energy company

Antero Resources Corporation
- Formerly: Antero Resources Appalachian Corporation
- Company type: Public company
- Traded as: NYSE: AR; S&P 400 component
- ISIN: US03674X1063
- Industry: Petroleum industry
- Founded: 2002; 23 years ago
- Founders: Paul M. Rady; Glen C. Warren, Jr.
- Headquarters: Denver, Colorado, U.S.
- Key people: Paul M. Rady Retired (Chairman & CEO); Glen C. Warren, Jr. Retired (President); Michael N. Kennedy (President & CEO); Brendan Krueger (CFO)
- Products: Natural gas; Ethane; Natural gas liquids; Petroleum
- Production output: 3.271 billion cubic feet of natural gas equivalent per day (2020)
- Revenue: ▲US$4.619 billion (2021)
- Net income: ▲US$-186 million (2021)
- Total assets: ▲US$13.896 billion (2021)
- Total equity: ▼US$5.757 billion (2021)
- Number of employees: 519 (December 31, 2021)
- Website: www.anteroresources.com

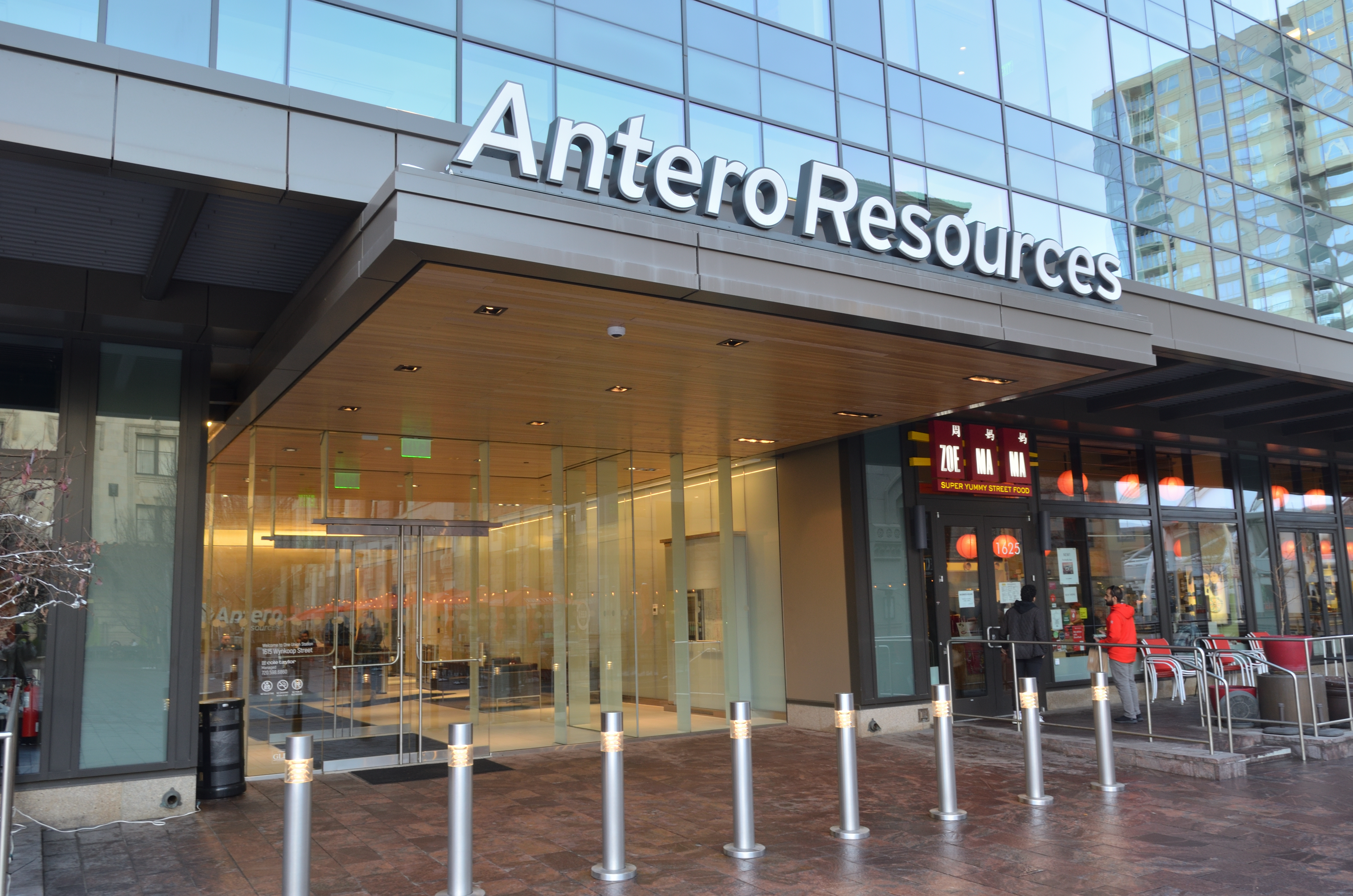
Antero Resources Headquarters in Denver

Antero Resources Corporation is an American company engaged in hydrocarbon exploration. It is organized in Delaware and headquartered in Denver, Colorado. The company's reserves are entirely in the Appalachian Basin (92% were in the Marcellus Shale and 8% were in the Utica Shale) and are extracted using hydraulic fracturing.

As of December 31, 2021, the company had 17,729 billion cubic feet (502 billion cubic meters) of estimated proved reserves, of which 61% was natural gas, 21% was ethane, 17% was natural gas liquids, and 1% was petroleum.

The company is ranked 672nd on the Fortune 500.

== History ==
The company was founded in 2002 by Paul M. Rady and Glen C. Warren, Jr. after they sold their previous venture, Pennaco Energy, to Marathon Oil.

Beginning in February 2003, Warburg Pincus invested over $1.5 billion into the company and at one time held a controlling stake.

In 2005, the company sold its assets in the Barnett Shale to XTO Energy.

In October 2013, the company became a public company via an initial public offering, raising $1.5 billion.

In November 2014, the company spun off 30% of its midstream operations, Antero Midstream Partners LP, via an initial public offering .

In September 2015, the company sold its integrated water business to its midstream affiliate for $1.05 billion.

In August 2016, the company acquired assets in the Marcellus Shale from Statoil for $96 million.

In January 2017, the company acquired assets in the Utica Shale from Rex Energy for $30 million.
