= Rex Cinema =

The Rex Cinema may refer to:

- The Cinema Rex in Abadan, Iran, noted for the 1978 Cinema Rex fire
- Cine Rex, a theatre in Antwerp destroyed by a V-2 rocket attack on 16 December 1944
- The Rex, Berkhamsted, a Grade II listed cinema in Hertfordshire, England, UK
- Rex Cultural Center by B92 in Belgrade, Serbia (formerly Cinema REX)

== See also ==
- Rex Theatre (disambiguation)
- Category:Cinemas and movie theaters by country
