= The Rex Steakhouse =

Restaurant in California, United States

- The Rex Steakhouse
- Interactive map of The Rex Steakhouse

Restaurant information
- Established: March 2020
- Head chef: Walter Nunez
- Food type: Steakhouse
- Dress code: Casual
- Location: 221 Avenue I, Suite 100, Hollywood Riviera, Redondo Beach, Los Angeles County, California, 90277, United States
- Coordinates: 33.8192°N 118.3866°W
- Reservations: Yes
- Other locations: No
- Website: therexsteakhouse.com

A Brief History of Our Namesake at The Rex Steakhouse

The Rex Steakhouse is an American steakhouse restaurant located in the Hollywood Riviera area of Redondo Beach, California.

The head chef is Walter Nunez.

The Rex was named after the SS Rex, a luxury gambling ship from the prohibition era of the 1930s.

== Critical reception ==
Time Out, "A standout South Bay steakhouse serving well-executed classics of the genre with hints of pan-Asian flair."

Daily Breeze, "As the name suggests, this is a serious destination for serious food in a serious setting — you don't call a restaurant The Rex unless you have aspirations to become... The Rex."

LA Weekly, "The Rex Steakhouse is fine dining at its best and a tough competitor in the steak sphere even beyond the South Bay."

According to Adriana Desiderio from Fabulous California, "Repeat after us: save room for dessert. The name of the game is butter, and The Rex is winning it."

Eater, "In Redondo Beach, this elegant steakhouse does beef exceedingly well with a wood-fired sear on the outside while maintaining a juicy, tender core. Chef Walter Nunez assembles a crowd-pleasing menu of clams casino, gnocchi with lobster, and lamb shank doused in rosemary."
