= Rexford =

Rexford may refer to:

== Places in the United States ==
- Rexford, Kansas
- Rexford, Montana
- Rexford, New York

== People ==
=== Given name ===
- Rex Cherryman (Rexford Raymond Cherryman, 1886–1921), American actor
- Rexford Tugwell (1891–1971), American economist

=== Surname ===
- Bill Rexford (1927–1994), American racing driver
- Eben E. Rexford (1848–1916), American songwriter
- Jennifer Rexford, American computer scientist
- Roswell B. Rexford, Michigan politician
- Samuel Rexford (1776–1857), New York politician
