= Rex Energy =

Natural gas exploration and production company

Rex Energy Corporation
- Industry: Petroleum industry
- Founded: March 8, 2007; 19 years ago
- Defunct: August 30, 2018; 7 years ago
- Fate: Acquired by PennEnergy Resources
- Headquarters: State College, Pennsylvania
- Key people: Lance T. Shaner, Chairman; Thomas C. Stabley, CEO; Thomas G. Rajan, CFO
- Products: Natural gas Natural gas liquids
- Production output: 195 million cubic feet of natural gas equivalent per day (2016)
- Revenue: ▲$0.139 billion (2016)
- Net income: ▼ -$0.176 billion (2016)
- Total assets: ▼$0.893 billion (2016)
- Total equity: ▼$0.10 billion (2016)
- Number of employees: 104 (2016)
- Website: rexenergycorporation.com

Rex Energy Corporation was a natural gas exploration and production company headquartered in State College, Pennsylvania. In 2018, the company was acquired by PennEnergy Resources.

The company's operations were entirely in the Appalachian Basin, in the Marcellus Shale, Utica Shale, and the Burkett Shale. The company primarily extracted resources using hydraulic fracturing. As of December 31, 2016, the company had 108 million barrels of oil equivalent (660,000,000 GJ) of estimated proved reserves, of which 56.8% was natural gas, 41.5% was natural gas liquids, and 1.7% was natural-gas condensate. In 2016, the company's production was 195 million cubic feet of natural gas equivalent per day.

== History ==
The company was founded in March 2007.

In July 2007, the company became a public company via an initial public offering.

In August 2010, the company entered into a $140 million joint venture with Sumitomo Corporation.

In May 2012, the company sold its interests in two cryogenic gas processing plants for $120 million.

In August 2014, the company acquired assets from Royal Dutch Shell for $120 million.

In June 2015, the company sold its water services subsidiary, Keystone Clearwater Solutions, to American Water Works for $130 million.

In August 2016, the company sold assets in the Illinois Basin for $40 million.

In January 2017, the company sold assets in the Utica Shale to Antero Resources for $30 million.

In May 2018, Rex Energy filed for bankruptcy.

In August 2018, the assets of the company were acquired by PennEnergy Resources.
