= Rex Varghese =

Indian bodybuilder

Rex Varghese (died 22 January 2013) was an Indian bodybuilder who became the first Keralite to win the Mr India title in the 90 kg category in 2007. He also had Junior Mr India, Mr Kerala, Muscleman of Kerala, Mr Kerala Olympia titles to his credit.

== Background ==
He was born to Varghese and Mary in a middle-class family. He became Sub Junior Mr Thrissur at the age of 16. Hailing from Mambra, Koratty, Thrissur.

== Career ==
Won the titles,

- Junior Mr India 2001 Jaipur
- Mr India
- Mr Kerala
- Muscleman of Kerala
- Mr Kerala Olympia

He was working as a travelling ticket examiner (TTE) with the Railways. He was unemployed in his last days.

== Death ==
Rex Varghese committed suicide in his house at Koratty on 22 January 2013. He was a bachelor.
