= Emily Sweeney (journalist) =

American journalist

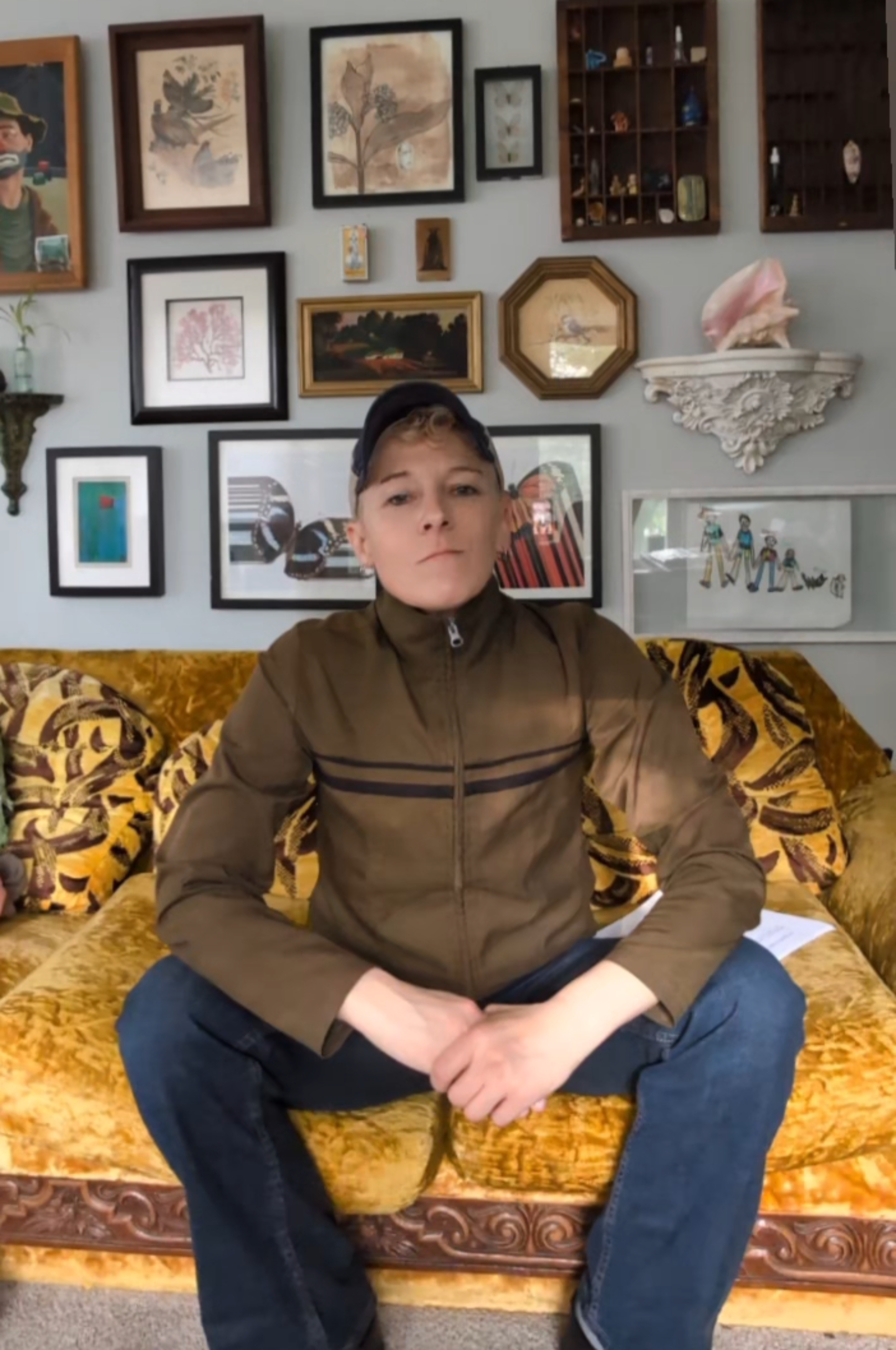
- Sweeney in 2026
- Born: Dorchester, Boston, Massachusetts, U.S.
- Education: Boston Latin; Northeastern University
- Occupations: Author; journalist
- Years active: 2003–present
- Employer: The Boston Globe

Emily Sweeney is an American journalist and crime reporter from Massachusetts who works as a columnist for The Boston Globe.

== Early life and education ==
Sweeney grew up in Dorchester, the daughter of Jeannie and Robert J. Sweeney. She graduated from Boston Latin School, where she played ice hockey on the boys varsity team and lettered in softball, soccer and hockey. She then went on to Northeastern University, where she played four seasons on the women's ice hockey team which won the 1997 ECAC hockey championship. She graduated from Northeastern with a bachelor's degree in journalism in 1998.

== Career ==
Sweeney has been a staff writer at The Boston Globe since 2003. She covers local news. Her weekly column, Blotter Tales, appears in the Metro section every Sunday. She also writes a newsletter for The Boston Globe called Cold Case Files. Her areas of expertise include local history, including crime and technology.

Sweeney's expertise has led to her appearance on many TV and radio programs including Court TV, the Travel Channel, Science Channel, Beat the Press, Bloomberg Radio, and NESN. She was a guest expert in Bloody Boston, a documentary series about organized crime in Boston, and she appears in three episodes of the Netflix series How To Become a Mob Boss.

She is also the author of three books including a curated series of crime photographs for Arcadia Publishing called Boston Organized Crime and a book about the history of Boston-area mobsters called Gangland Boston. Gangland Boston includes a section about the life of Whitey Bulger, a crime boss in the part of Boston where Sweeney grew up. Her biography of John "Dropkick" Murphy, Dropkick Murphy: A Legendary Life, was published in 2023. Murphy is the namesake of the band Dropkick Murphys.

Sweeney produces multimedia content for The Boston Globe. In 2025 she created an interactive feature for The Boston Globe called "When Travel was Treacherous for Black People: The Green Book's Legacy in New England", documenting over 300 Green Book locations in New England. Sweeney does reporting on the newspaper's Instagram account where she often receives kudos for her local accent. In April 2026 her reporting on a local burglary went viral on TikTok and Instagram. This popularity helped shift her into being "a regular on the paper's social platforms."

== Bibliography ==
- Boston Organized Crime (2012) ISBN 978-0-7385-7673-2
- Gangland Boston (2017) ISBN 978-1-4930-3036-1
- Dropkick Murphy: A Legendary Life (2023) ISBN 978-1-949590-64-7
- Four on the Floor: The Story of Bobby Luisi and Boston's Last Mob War (2026) ISBN 978-1-949590-67-8
