= Rex Job =

Australian rules footballer

Personal information
- Full name: Frederick Rexford Job
- Born: 9 August 1910; Long Gully, Victoria
- Died: 24 May 1999 (aged 88); Brunswick East, Victoria
- Original team: Ararat

Playing career^{1}
Years	Club	Games (Goals)
1931	Carlton	1 (0)
- ^{1} Playing statistics correct to the end of 1931.

Frederick Rexford Job (9 August 1910 – 24 May 1999) was an Australian rules footballer who played with Carlton in the Victorian Football League (VFL).
