= .rex =

.rex may refer to:

- A file extension used by Rexx and ooRexx scripts
- A file extension used by REX2
