= John Murphy (sanatorium operator) =

American professional wrestler and sanatorium owner

Coordinates: 42°30′03.7″N 71°24′53.5″W

- Born: May 12, 1912; Malden, Massachusetts
- Died: October 17, 1977 (aged 65); Concord, Massachusetts
- Other name: Dropkick Murphy
- Occupations: wrestler, sanatorium owner

John E. "Dropkick" Murphy (May 12, 1912 – October 17, 1977) was an American professional wrestler and sanatorium owner. He operated the Bellows Farms Sanatorium, an alcoholic rehabilitation facility in Acton, Massachusetts from 1941 to 1971. The American rock band Dropkick Murphys is named after him.

== Wrestling career ==
Murphy executing a dropkick on Jim Maloney, 1939

Murphy was a Doctor of Osteopathic Medicine, having been graduated from the Massachusetts College of Osteopathy, but he never practiced. Instead, he was a professional wrestler in the 1930s and 1940s, mostly competing in the Northeastern United States, sometimes billed as "Dr. John (Dropkick) Murphy". Murphy competed in matches, some promoted by Paul Bowser and Jack Pfefer, at places and venues including Portland, Maine, the Boston Arena and Mechanics Hall in Boston, Massachusetts, The Mosque (a roller rink) in Bridgeport, Connecticut, the Rex Arena in Lowell, Massachusetts, the Philadelphia Arena, the Convention Hall on Line Street in Camden, New Jersey, the Grand Olympic Auditorium in Los Angeles, the Montreal Forum, the Opera House in Newark, New Jersey, the Ridgewood Grove Sports Club in Ridgewood, Queens, New York City, the Fort Hamilton Arena in Brooklyn, New York City and St. Nicholas Palace (also called the Royal Windsor Palace) and Hippodrome, in Manhattan, New York City.

== Sanatorium ==
1942 classified ad for Bellows Farm Sanatorium uses euphemisms

Murphy, with his wife Marie (and after her death, his second wife Jean) owned a farmhouse at 42 Davis Road in north Acton, Massachusetts, and adjoining property, near the intersection of Great Road (route 2A) and Main Street (route 27). Filling a need that Murphy saw, the facility was turned into a rehabilitation center for alcoholics to "dry out" (as the alcohol detoxification process was informally called during those times). The name of the facility was the Bellows Farm Sanatorium, but it was almost universally called Dropkick Murphy's.

In America in the middle of the twentieth century, alcoholism was more often considered a character flaw and shameful secret rather than a disease (the American Medical Association declared alcoholism to be a disease only in 1956, for instance). In recognition of this, Murphy's client list was kept private, and a comprehensive list of clients is probably lost to history. But long before facilities such as the Betty Ford Clinic made celebrity rehabilitation more public and acceptable, the Bellows Farm Sanatorium treated clients including, according to rumor and legend, celebrities from the sporting and entertainment worlds of Boston and further afield, such as Jackie Gleason.

And how would you like to be Joe Kennedy? Here’s your uncle [Ted Kennedy], looking more like an escapee from Dropkick Murphy’s every day, and he says he’s going to run again in 1994?

— Howie Carr, 1991 Boston Herald column

Popular Boston newspaper columnist Howie Carr would occasionally reference Dropkick Murphy's sanatorium, sometimes in jeering reference to the Kennedy family, a particular bête noire and hobbyhorse of Carr's.

The facility closed in 1971, Murphy died in 1977, and the sanatorium farmhouse has been converted to professional offices Some of the land around the sanatorium's former location has been developed into the Briarbrook Village Apartments and other properties. Nashoba Brook runs through the property, the Nashoba Brook–Spring Hill–Camp Acton conservation areas are adjacent, and the Acton portion of the Bay Circuit hiking trail runs nearby.

In 2023, a biography of Dr. Murphy was published. Author Emily Sweeney unearthed many details of Murphy's life, and with the cooperation of the Murphy family provided previously unseen family photos. Interviews with former staff and a person who had stayed at the farm were also included.

I have always heard old-timers around Boston talk about a dry-out place around in the 1950s and '60s, called... Dropkick Murphy's Place. I loved that name so much that we planned to use it for a band name long before we ever had a band.

— Ken Casey of Dropkick Murphys

The popular Boston punk band Dropkick Murphys, formed in 1996, were named after Murphy and his sanatorium. None of the band's past or current members have any connection to Murphy; the name was chosen because founder and frontman Ken Casey liked the sound of it. A foreword by Casey is included in a biography of Dr. Murphy.
