= Rex Wakely Smith =

South African rally driver and philatelist (1930–2013)

Sydney Rex Wakely-Smith
- Born: 22 January 1930; Johannesburg
- Died: 5 December 2013 (aged 83); Hillcrest, KwaZulu-Natal, South Africa
- Education: St John's school
- Known for: South African Rally Champion 1964 & 1965; Philately
- Board member of: Philatelic Federation of South Africa
- Spouse: Ethne Wakely-Smith
- Children: 3

Sydney Rex Wakely-Smith (1930 – 5 December 2013) was a South African rally driver and philatelist. He was South African Rally Champion with Ewold van Bergen in 1964 and 1965. He was president of the Philatelic Federation of South Africa in 2004 and won medals for his collection of the philately of Mozambique.

== Early life and family ==
Sydney Rex Wakely-Smith was born in Johannesburg in 1930. He was educated at St John's school. He married Ethne Denise Lambert in on 31 October 1953, when he was 23 years old. They were married for 60 years before he sadly passed in Hillcrest, South Africa at 83 years old. They had three children and many grandchildren and great grandchildren.

== Motor sport ==
Wakely Smith was South African Rally Champion with Ewold van Bergen in 1964 and 1965.

Wakely Smith was awarded Springbok colours for motor sport.

== Philately ==
Wakely Smith inherited an interest in philately from his mother. He was a member of the Philatelic Society of Natal and president of the Philatelic Federation of South Africa in 2004. He specialised in the philately of Mozambique and won a Large Gold medal in South Africa for his exhibit of that country as well as a Large Silver medal at the international stamp exhibition in Dubai.

Other hobbies included ornithology and conchology.

== Death ==
Wakely Smith died on 5 December 2013.
