= Rex Center =

Arena and entertainment center in Lowell, Massachusetts

Coordinates: 42°38′41.1″N 71°18′23.2″W

The Rex Center was an arena and entertainment center in downtown Lowell, Massachusetts, existing from 1933 to 1960.

Entrepreneur and car dealer Charles Dancause created the Rex, which opened in 1933 in a renovated mill building, the old Prescott Division Plant of Mass Cotton Mills. The architect of the conversion was Harry Prescott Graves.

Among the entertainments offered at the Rex was dining (the Rex Grille, which also offered floorshows), bars, a dancing ballroom, duckpin bowling (65 lanes), roller skating, pool (30 tables), and Victorian Turkish baths. There were five banquet halls; banquets, wedding receptions, and other events were held there. The Rex Center constituted an important part of Lowell social life in the mid 20th century; the Lowell Sun described it as "one of Lowell's landmark spots" and "the sports and dining showplace of Lowell".

The Rex Arena in the center seated 1,000 or 2,000 and hosted boxing matches, and also wrestling matches (featuring appearances by Jim Londos, Ed "Strangler" Lewis, The French Angel, Man Mountain Dean, Dropkick Murphy, Bull Curry and many others), particularly after the older Crescent Rink on Hurd Street burned down. Semi-pro basketball games were played there, and the Harlem Globetrotters appeared there.

The Rex Center burned down on June 25, 1960. The huge fire raged out of control for several hours, and of the more than 300 firefighters from Lowell and 14 other towns, sixteen were injured. The derelict building was torn down in 1971 and replaced with a parking lot. Wang Laboratories built a training center at the site in 1984, which in 1990 was purchased by Middlesex Community College and is now used as its Lowell campus.
