= Rex Hazlewood (disambiguation) =

Rex Hazlewood may be:

- Rex Hazlewood, official with the Scout Association
- Rex Hazlewood (architect), Australian architect
- Rex Hazlewood (photographer), Australian photographer, see Lord Livingstone Ramsay
