= David Evelyn Nye =

British architect

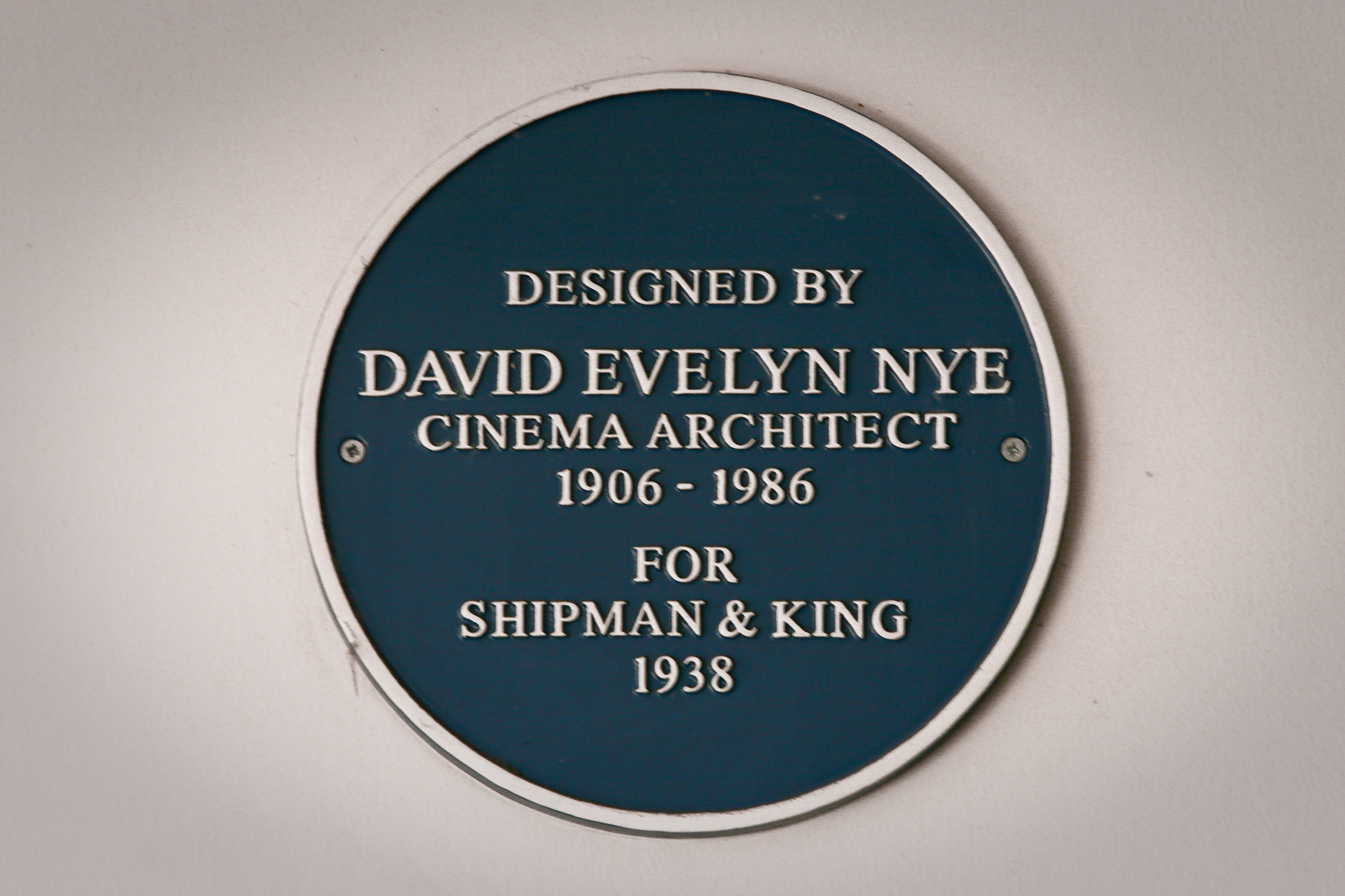
- Blue plaque on the Berkhamsted Rex commemorating Nye's work
- Born: 1906
- Died: 1986 (aged 79–80)
- Occupation: Architect
- Known for: Cinema architect

David Evelyn Nye MBE was a British architect, born in 1906, who practised in Surrey, England. He was best known as a cinema architect, having designed many picture houses in the 1930s for the Shipman and King cinema circuit. He was a committed Christian, abstainer and vegetarian.

== Architectural work ==
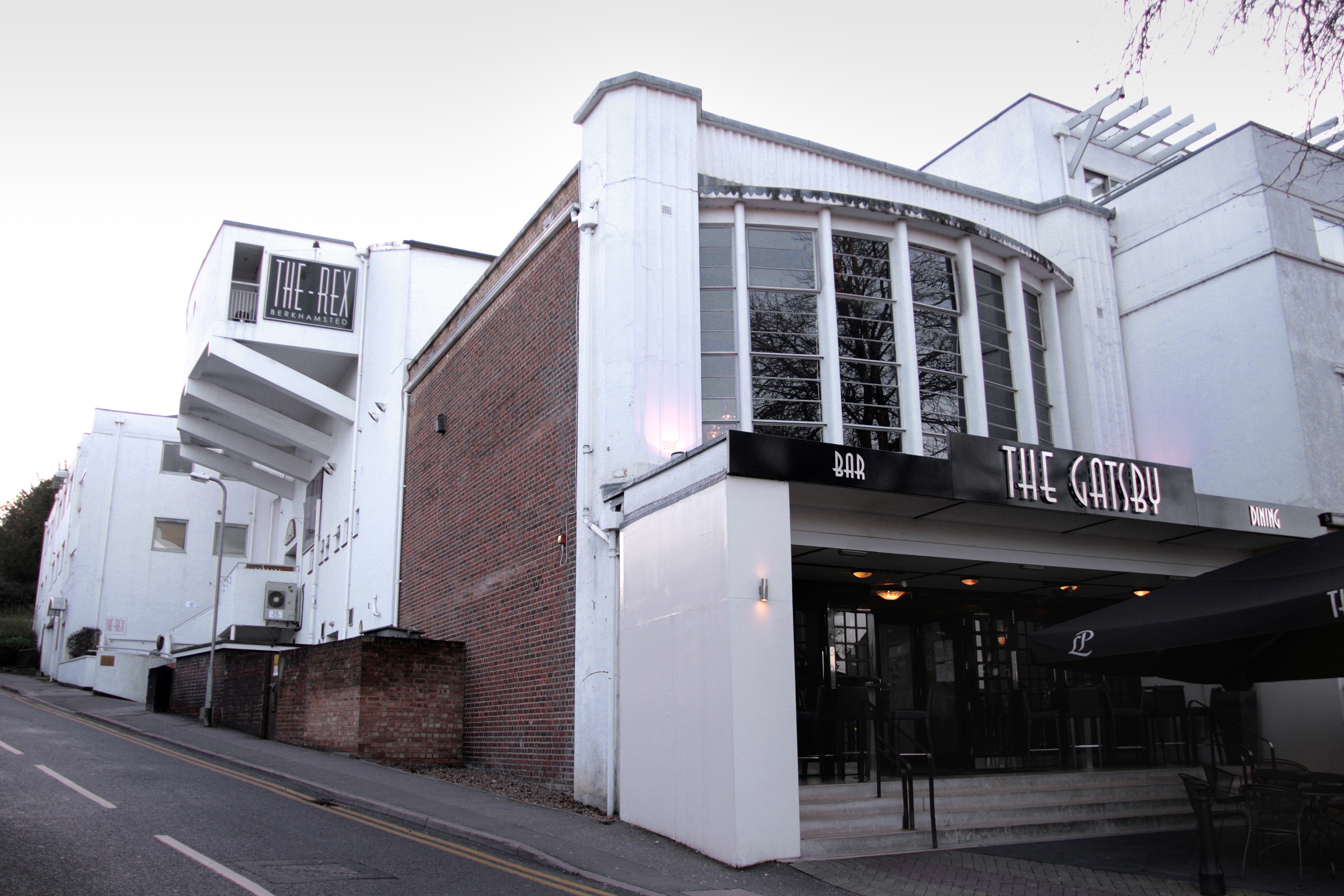
Nye's Rex Cinema in Berkhamsted (1937)

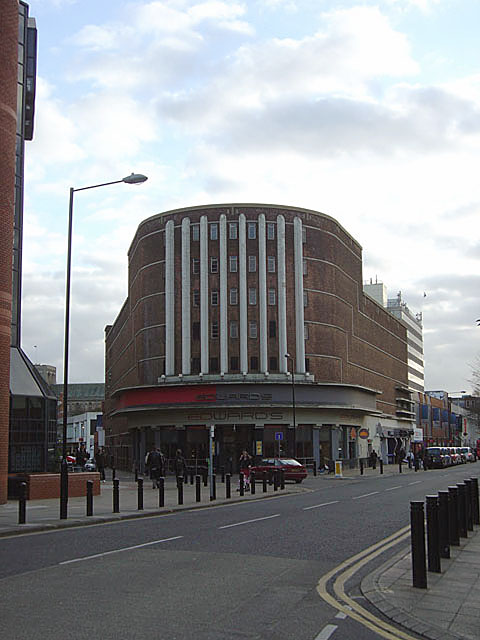
Nye's only theatre project, the 1937 Embassy Theatre in Peterborough

In 1930 he was awarded the first scholarship by the Society for the Protection of Ancient Buildings, through which he learned about the restoration of ancient buildings. Nye set up his own practice in 1931, initially working as honorary architect to the Essex Rural Community Council in Maldon, Essex. He was responsible for the 1932 restoration work on Thomas Plume's Library. It was in Maldon that he secured his first cinema project, designing the Embassy Cinema for the Shipman & King cinema circuit, which was erected on Maldon High Street in 1936. The Embassy was demolished in 1987 to make way for a sheltered housing complex, Embassy Court.

Nye continued his association with Shipman & King for another 9 years, designing over 40 cinemas. His most renowned cinema design was possibly the Rex, Berkhamsted, an Art Deco picture house designed in 1937 with a nautical theme, featuring decorations of waves, shells and portholes. The Rex was eventually turned into a bingo hall and then closed in 1988, but the building was listed Grade II by English Heritage, preserving it from demolition by property developers. A local campaign to restore the Rex succeeded and in 2004 it was re-opened as an independent cinema.

During World War II Nye served in the Royal Navy. After the war, he began his work as an architect again, specialising in church building and restoration. He designed the church of St Faith's Church, Dulwich in the mid-1950s. He was appointed Architect to the Diocese of Southwark and Architect and Surveyor to Guildford Cathedral. His practice also carried out restoration work for the National Trust and was responsible for the reconstruction of All Hallows, London Wall after wartime bombing and the new Pewterers' Hall in Oat Lane in the City in 1960. Another restoration was of the Dartmouth Butterwalk which had been severely damaged during German air raids in 1943.

Nye was chairman of SPAB’s Technical panel for several years.

The Architects' Practice of Nye, Saunders and Partners, based in Godalming, Surrey, was formed in 1971 following the merger of David Evelyn Nye & Partners with A.E.F. Saunders and Associates, and today the Nye Saunders practice continues to specialise in church and historic building conservation.

== Buildings ==
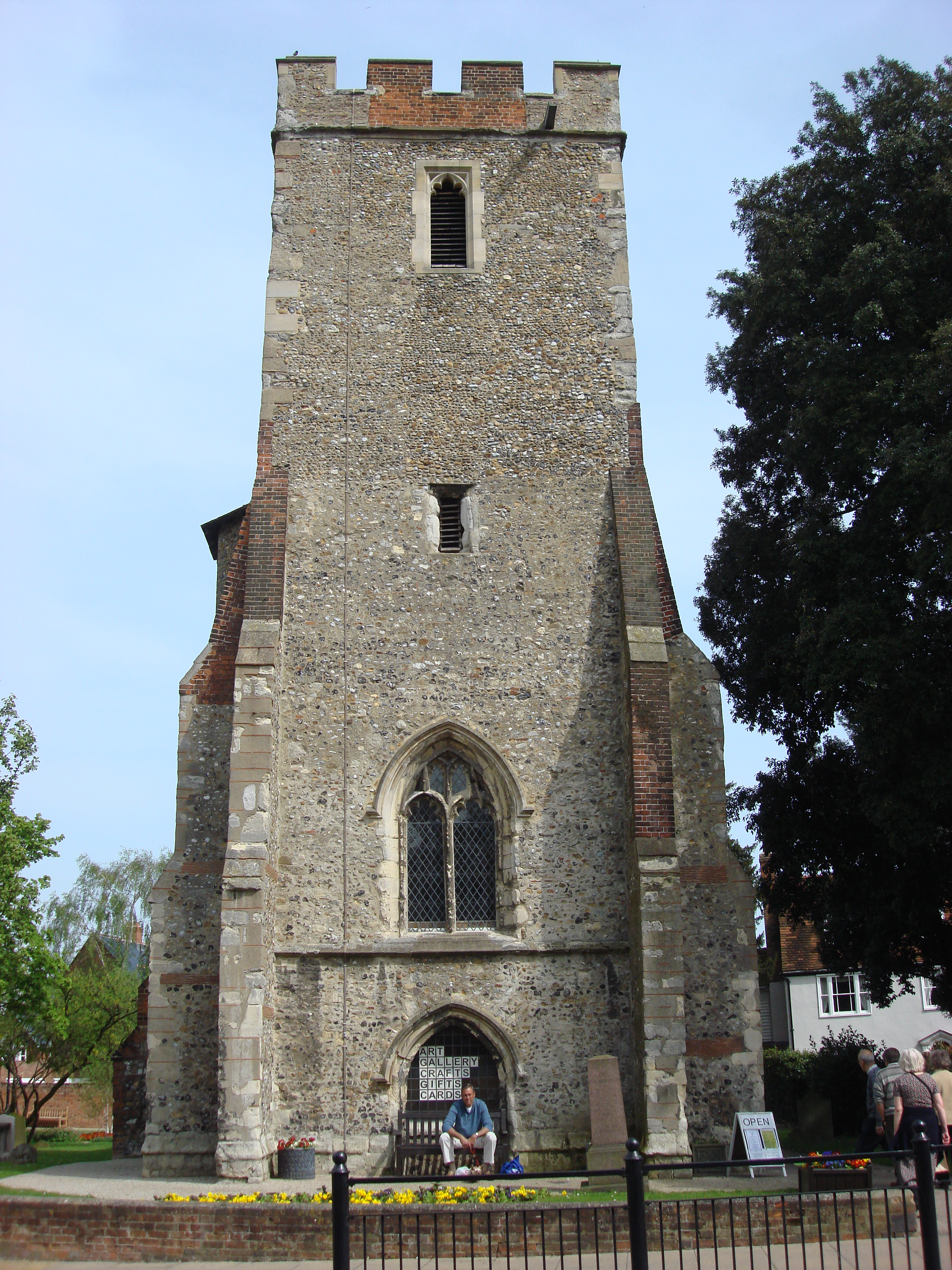
Thomas Plume's Library, Maldon

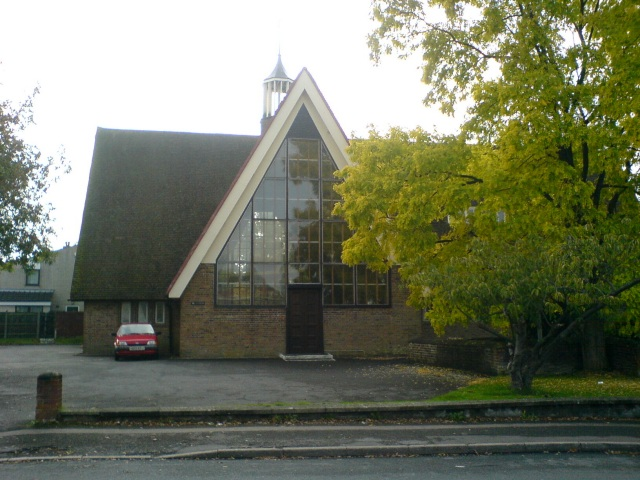
Christ the King, Salfords

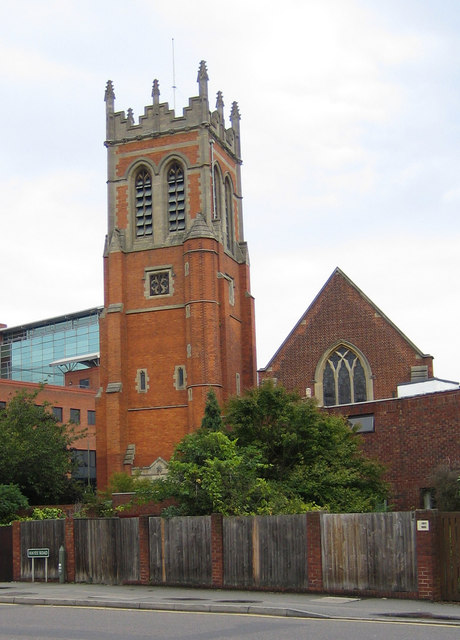
St Mark's Bromley

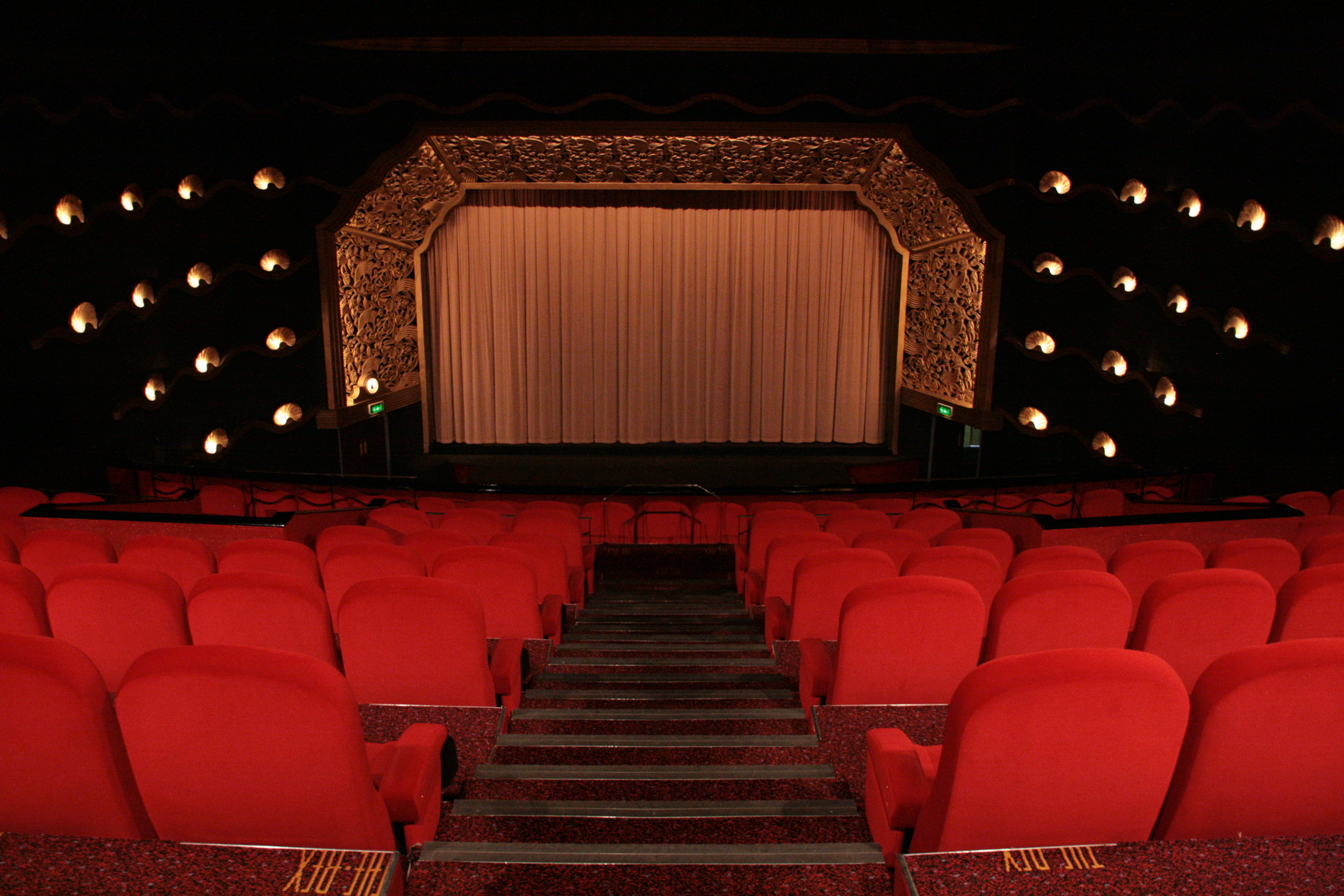
The interior of Nye's Rex Cinema, Berkhamsted
- The Rex Cinema, Berkhamsted, Hertfordshire (1937)
- St Faith's Church, Dulwich, London
- St Mark's Church, Bromley, London (restoration, 1953–54)
- St Swithin’s Church, Purley, London (1954–55)
- Church of Christ the King, Salfords, Surrey (1958–67)
- Embassy Theatre, Peterborough (1937)

== Cinemas ==
Everyman Esher in Esher, United Kingdom (4 screens) Maxime Cinema in Blackwood, United Kingdom (5 screens) Rex Cinema in Berkhamsted, United Kingdom (1 screen)
