= Rex Theatre =

Rex Theatre or Rex Theater may refer to:

- Rex Theater (Haiti), Port-au-Prince, Haiti
- Rex Theater (Vale, Oregon), United States
- Rex-Theater (Wuppertal), Germany
- Rex Theatre, Adelaide, Australia
- Rex Theatre (Whitewood), Saskatchewan, Canada

== See also ==
- Rex Cinema (disambiguation)
