= The Rex, Berkhamsted =

Cinema in Berkhamsted, Hertfordshire, England

The Rex
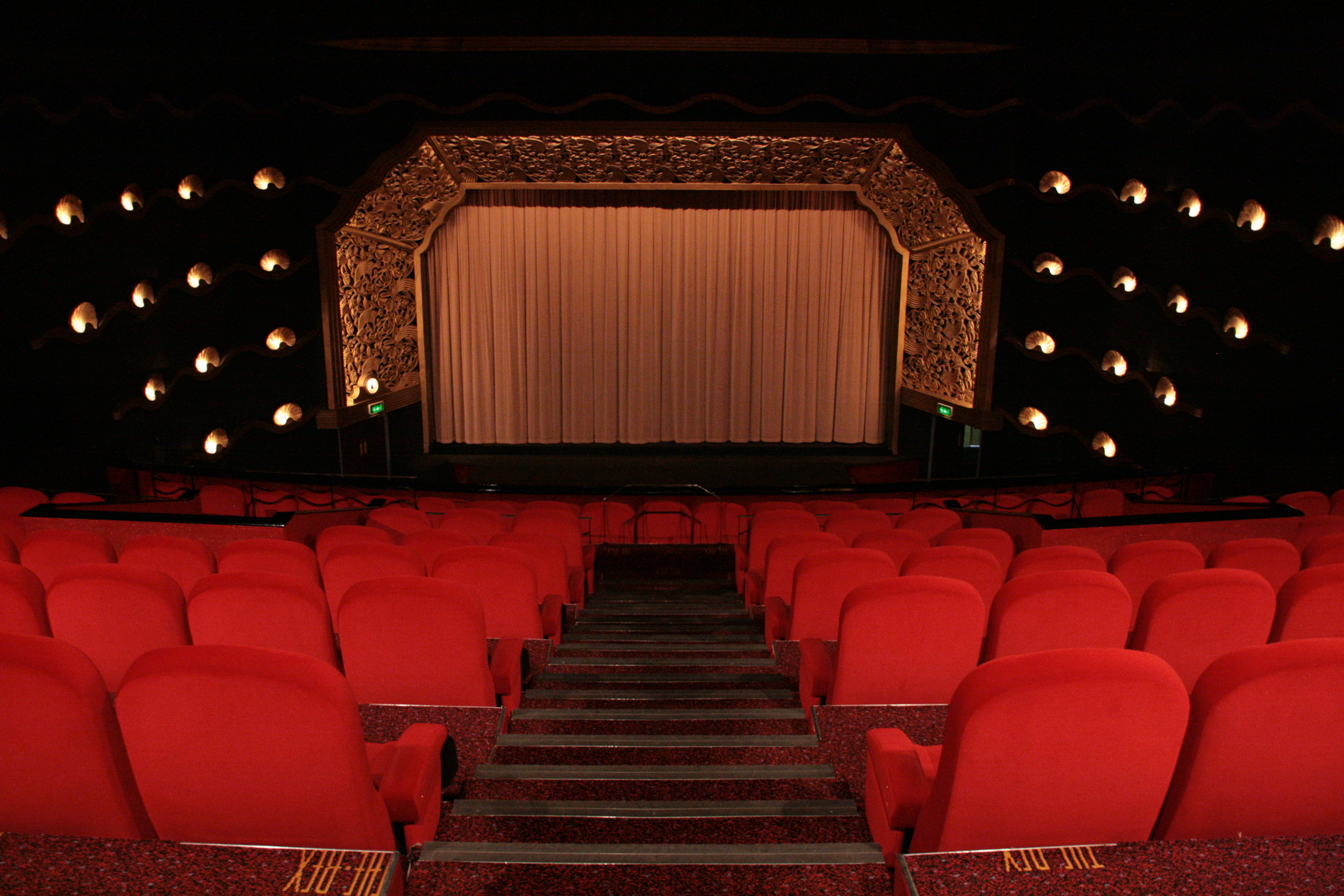
- The Rex auditorium

- Location within Hertfordshire
- Address: High Street; Berkhamsted; England, UK
- Coordinates: 51.758809°N 0.560389°W
- Owner: Nicholas King Homes
- Capacity: 350 (originally 1100)

Construction
- Opened: 1937
- Closed: 1988
- Reopened: 2004
- Architect: David Evelyn Nye

Tenant
- James Hannaway

Website
- www.therexberkhamsted.com

Listed Building – Grade II
- Official name: REX CINEMA
- Designated: 26 February 1988
- Reference no.: 1078110

The Rex is a cinema in the town of Berkhamsted, Hertfordshire, England. Designed in the art deco style by David Evelyn Nye in 1936, the cinema opened to the public in 1938. After 50 years of service, the cinema closed in 1988 and became derelict. The building was listed Grade II by English Heritage, and following a campaign to save the Rex by a local entrepreneur, the cinema re-opened to the public in 2004.

Today, the cinema is a fully operational independent cinema, screening films 362 days of the year. The programme ranges from vintage classic films to modern blockbusters which often attract large box office queues.

== History ==
Prior to the development of the Rex Cinema, Egerton House, an Elizabethan mansion had stood on the site for approximately 350 years. Built during the reign of Queen Elizabeth I, the house was latterly noted for its literary association with J. M. Barrie, author of Peter Pan, through its brief occupancy by the Llewelyn Davies family. Egerton House was demolished in 1937 to make way for the Rex Cinema.

In the 1930s, a cinema was already in operation in Berkhamsted High Street, the Court Cinema on the corner of Water Lane. It was acquired around 1930 by the Shipman & King cinema circuit, who also planned to open a second cinema in the town. Originally they intended to build on a site at the eastern end of town on the corner of Swing Gate Lane, but in 1936 S&K acquired Egerton House, a site closer to the centre of town which had spacious grounds for a cinema and car park. Egerton House was demolished and the Rex Cinema was erected in its place. The cinema was opened on 9 May 1938 by Viscountess Davidson, and the first screening was the film Heidi, starring Shirley Temple.

In the 1970s, business waned and the Rex was no longer commercially successful. In January 1973 it was taken over by the Star Group, who renamed the cinema Studio 1. Films were shown Sunday to Wednesday, and Thursday-Sunday the building was given over to the more commercially lucrative pastime of bingo, like so many cinemas in this period. The dining room was filled with fruit machines. In 1976 the cinema changed hands once more and was taken over by the gambling company Zetters, who made major alterations to the building by dividing the auditorium into three sections. The last film to be screened on the big screen before this change was Rollerball on 7 April 1976. The circle was divided into two small studio screens, Studio 1 and Studio 2 (accessed via the front foyer stairs), while the stalls were converted to use as a full-time bingo hall (accessed through the old café area). The studios opened on 11 April with Swinging Wives and Sex in the Office in Studio 1 and The Bruce Lee Story and Somebody's Stolen our Russian Spy in Studio 2.

=== Closure ===
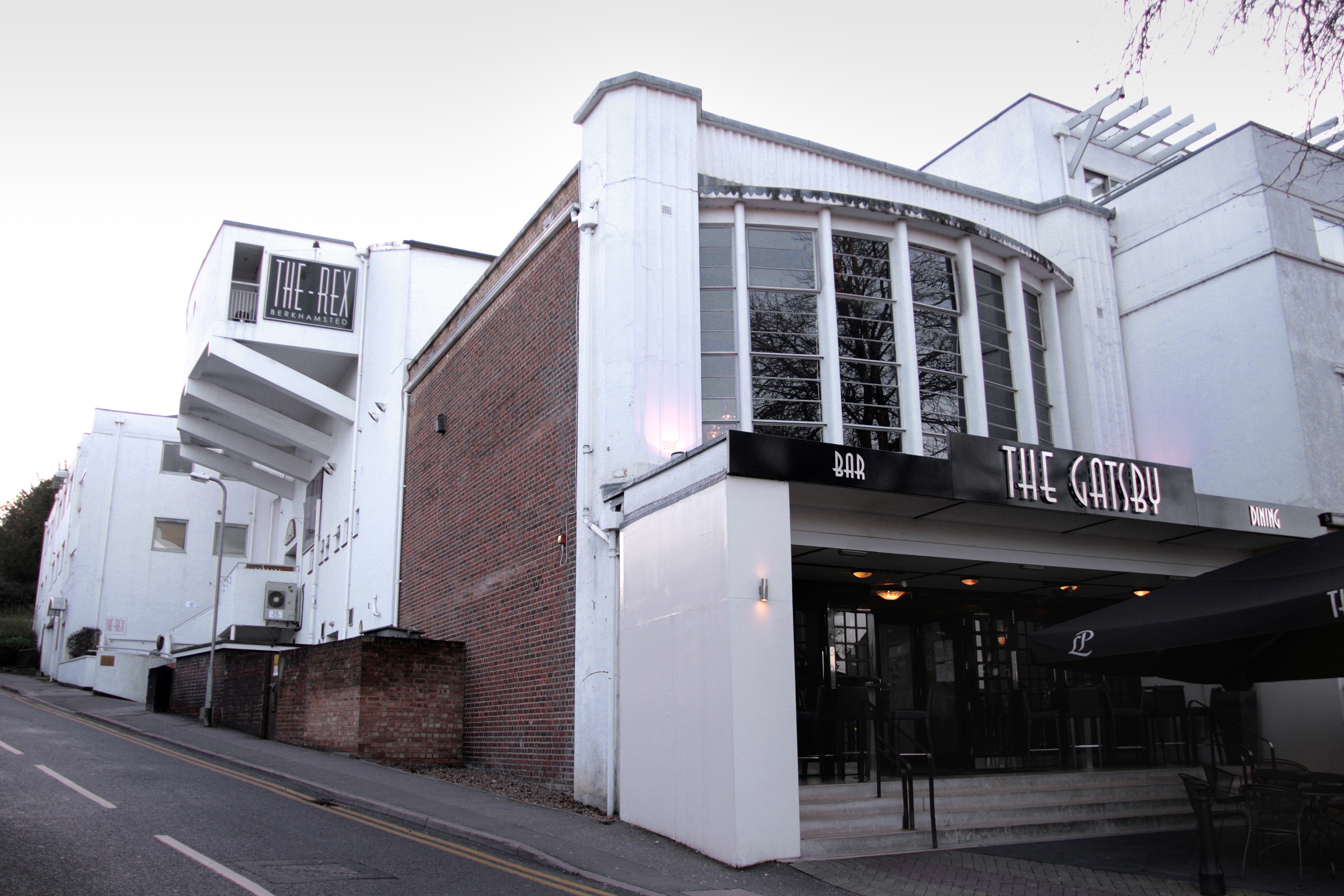
Exterior of the Rex (2011)

Zetters' lease expired in 1988 and the Rex was sold to a property developer who planned to demolish the building to make way for new offices and flats. After a final screening of The Witches of Eastwick and Teen Wolf Too, the cinema closed its doors on 28 February 1988. Efforts by campaigners resulted in the Rex being spot-listed by English Heritage. A planning inspector for the Department of the Environment reported that Nye's building contributed to the "diverse nature" of Berkhamsted High Street and that the quality and quantity of the surviving interior features merited preservation, and redevelopment plans were quashed. The building's listed status protected it from demolition and severely limited any redevelopment schemes. Various proposals were put forward for the site, including: a plan to convert the Rex auditorium into an atrium for an office building (1992); a proposal for an office complex with twin lecture theatres in the divided circle with a restored restaurant area (1993), and a plan to convert the building into a health spa (1997); these all failed to meet the strict criteria for a listed building. A fire in 1994 damaged the stage area. By this time the building had become very run down and the owners, Estates and General Property Company, attempted to have the building de-listed to enable demolition. In 1996, they attempted to dispose of the property and offered it to local entrepreneur James Hannaway for £450,000. Hannaway hoped to restore and re-open the cinema, but was unable to raise the money, and the Rex was bought by Nicholas King Homes.

A local campaign group, Friends of the Rex, was formed in 1997 with the aim of saving the Rex from demolition and acquiring it for use as a film centre, with film critic Barry Norman as their honorary president. The campaign was supported by the Twentieth Century Society, Joan Bakewell, and actors Hugh Grant, Hayley Mills and Ian Richardson. Campaigners formed the Rex Film and Arts Centre Trust to put forward a number of commercial proposals for a leisure complex including cinema screens, a swimming pool and a pub. The dilapidated state of the Rex was discussed in the House of Commons; Tom Clarke of the Department for Culture, Media and Sport declined to offer government subsidy for restoring the Rex, and the local MP Richard Page took the view that the Rex was now an eyesore and should be de-listed and demolished to make way for sheltered housing.

=== Redevelopment and re-opening ===
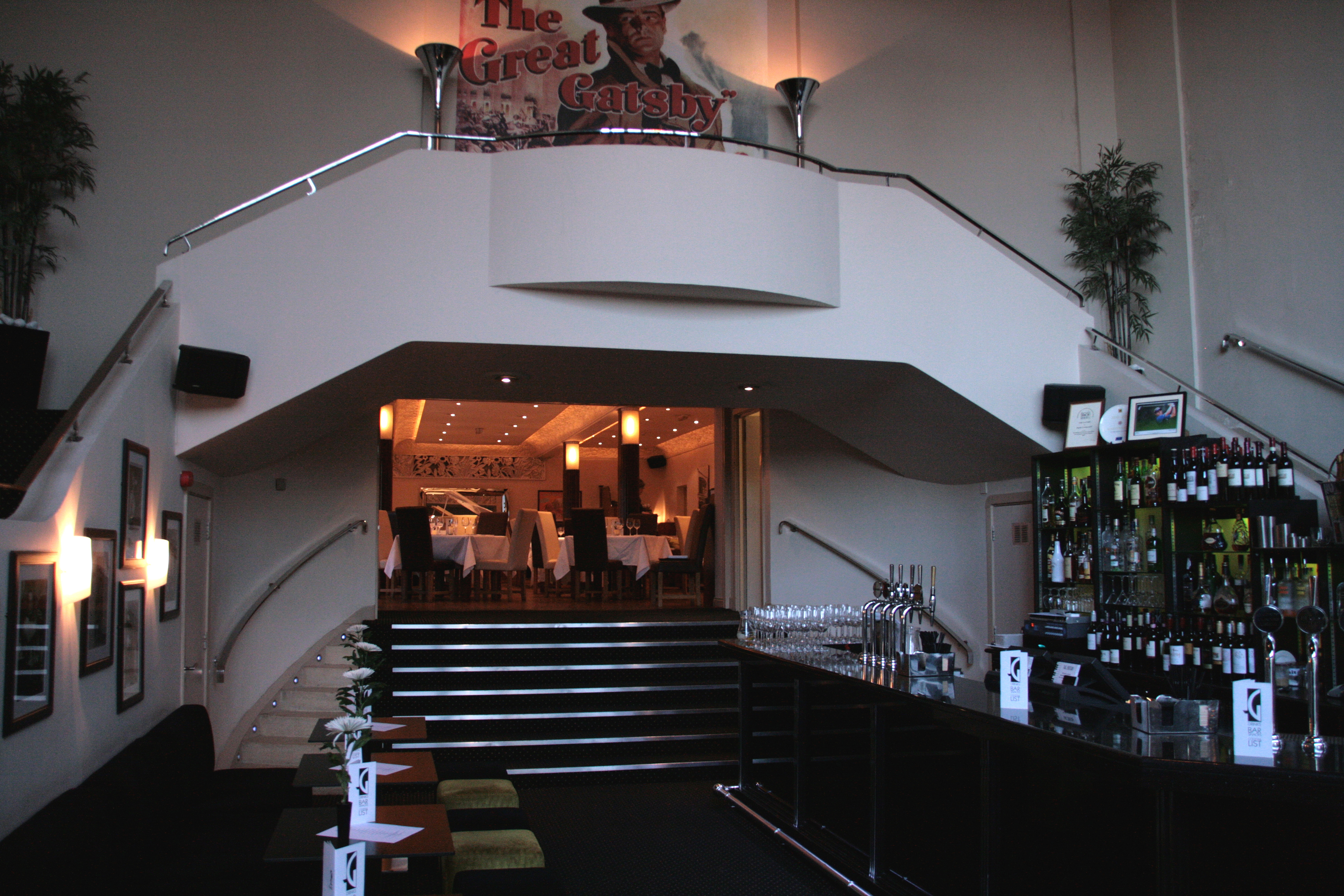
The original entrance foyer, now The Gatsby bar and restaurant

The proposal from property developer Nicholas King Homes, which envisaged building an apartment block around the cinema (replacing the neighbouring shop fronts) and converting the Rex foyer into a bar and restaurant, was successful, and conversion of the site began in 2000.

In 2001, Hannaway won the contract to restore the cinema interior; with a team of volunteer workers, he pulled down the partition walls and restored the auditorium to single-screen function. The project applied unsuccessfully for National Lottery funding and instead raised funds by selling membership and asking supporters to sponsor a seat. Actor Bill Nighy was among the first to contribute to the effort. The dilapidated interior was restored to its 1930s glory and leased to Hannaway for use once more as a cinema.

The cinema re-opened to the public in December 2004 with a screening of The Third Man, a film of particular significance as it was made during the heyday of the original Rex and the screenplay was by Berkhamsted writer Graham Greene.

The re-opening of the Rex doors to the public was acclaimed by critics; the Daily Telegraph remarked in 2006 that the luxurious facilities of the Rex and notable lack of popcorn were "the cinematic equivalent of turning left on a long-haul flight" (a reference to flying first class), and suggested that the guest appearance by Dame Judi Dench had been overlooked by local media only because of the major Buncefield fire which occurred that day.

After the success of the Rex restoration, Hannaway went on to a second cinema project. After a public campaign and fundraising scheme, he led a project to restore a derelict Art Deco cinema in nearby St Albans, which re-opened in November 2014 as the Odyssey Cinema, St Albans.

== Architecture ==
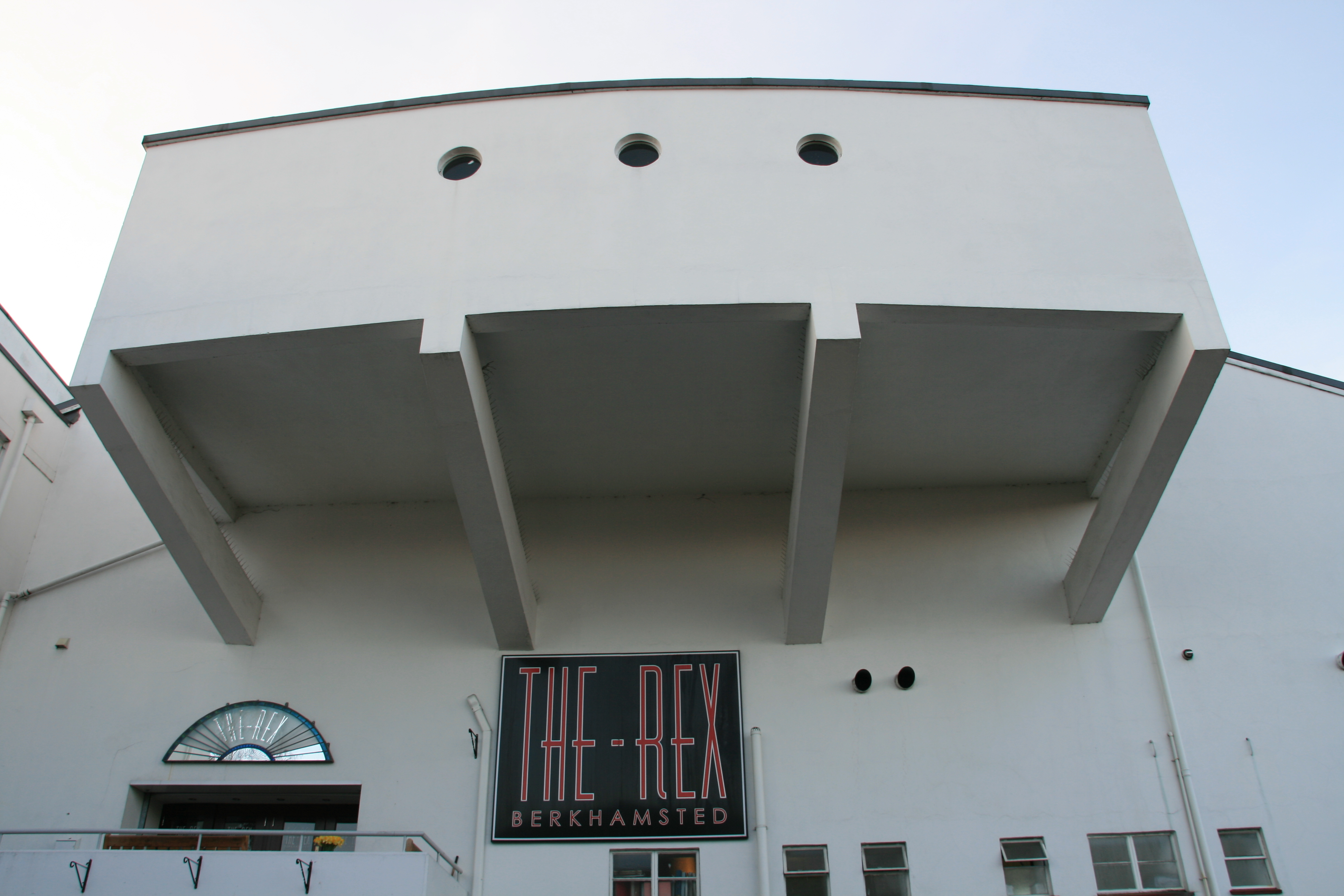
The protruding projection room

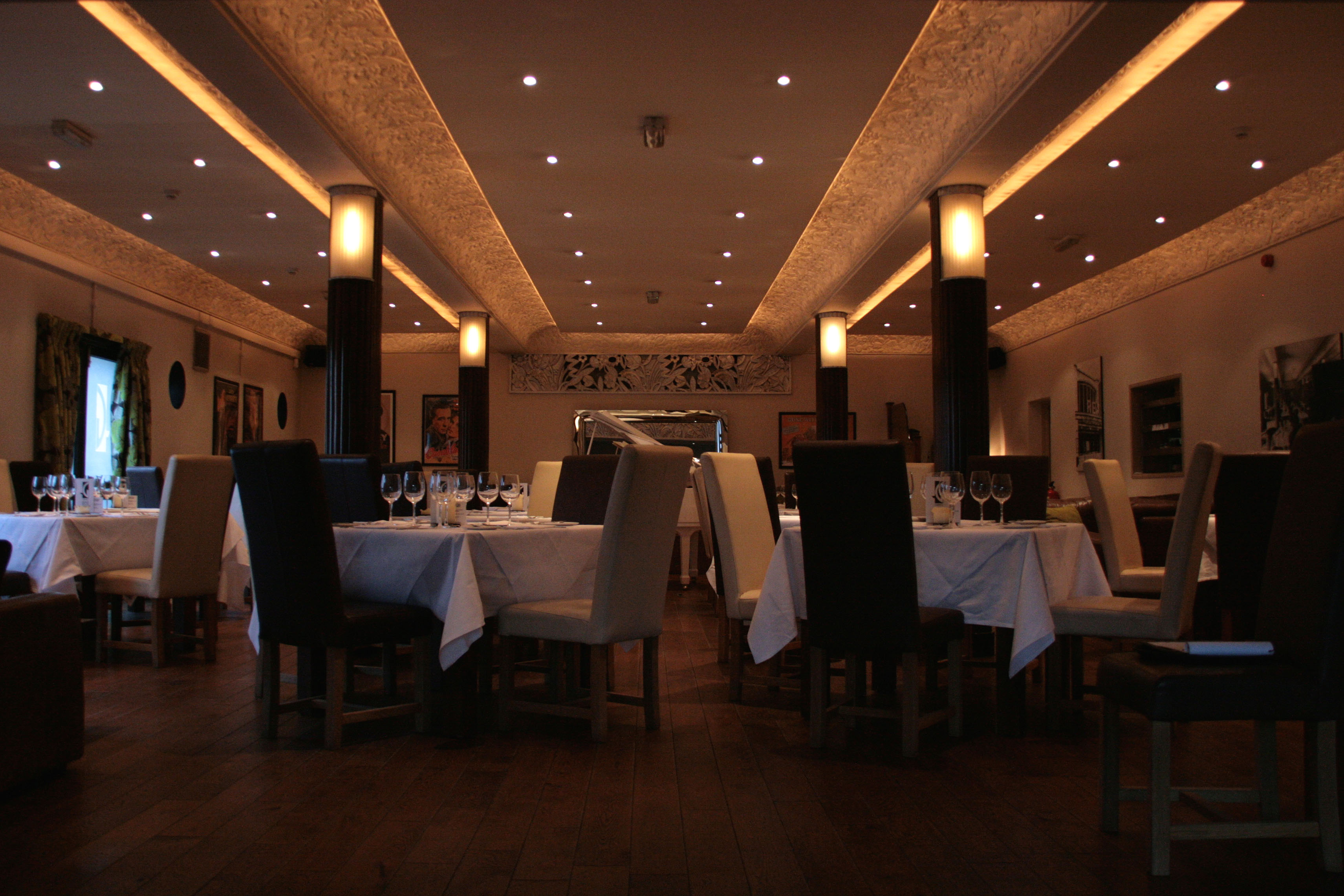
the 1938 dining room

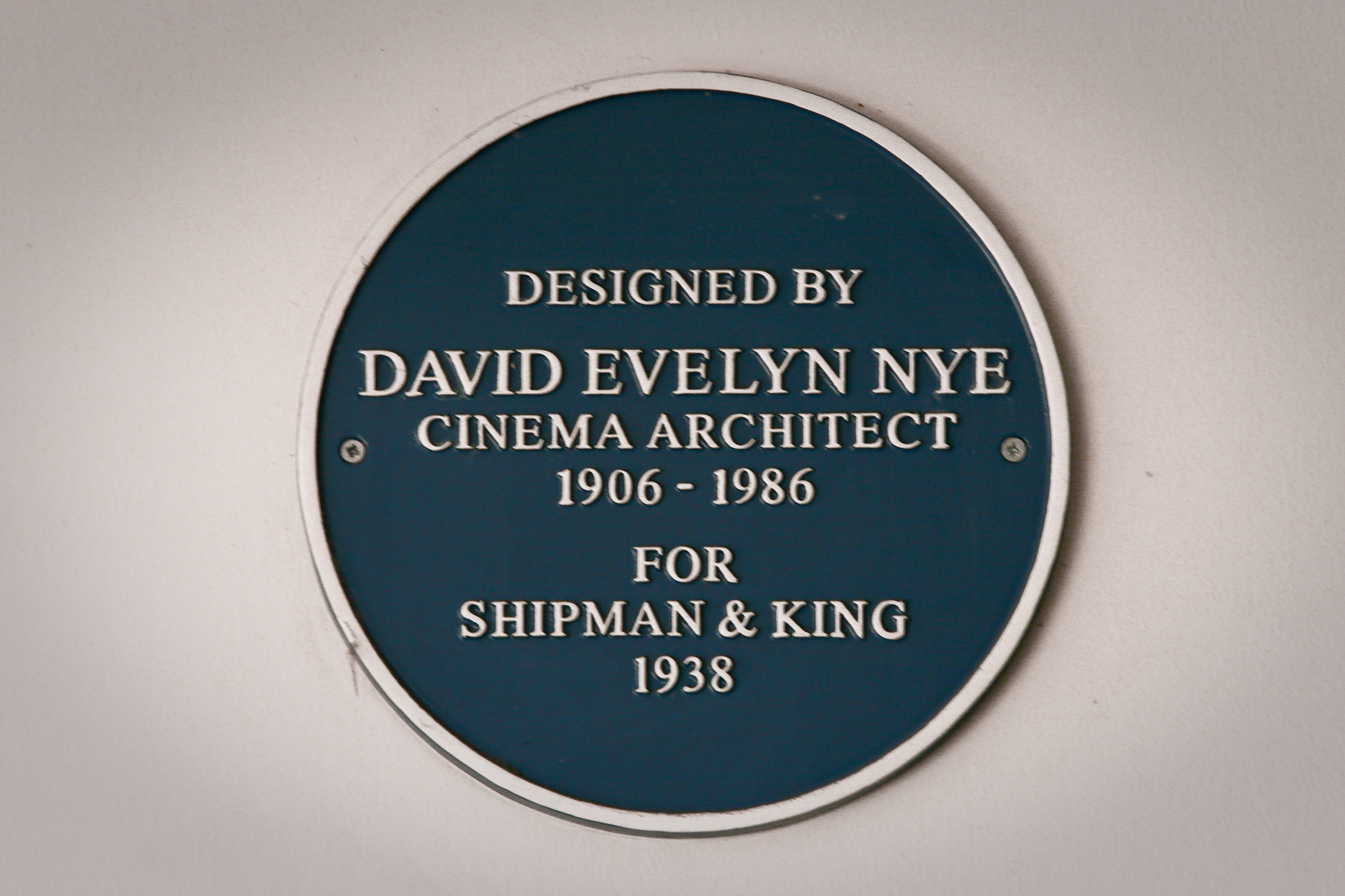
Blue plaque commemorating the architect Nye

The Rex was designed in a striking Art Deco style by architect David Evelyn Nye.

When the cinema was opened, the main entrance to the Rex was on the corner of the High Street, with a curved concrete canopy and tall vertical windows illuminating the double-height entrance foyer. Within the foyer, a large Art Deco chandelier hung from a decorated ceiling above a curved island ticket booth.

In those days, cinemagoers would access the auditorium either via steps up to the stalls or via the two staircases which swept up to a central door to the circle seats. The auditorium was placed at 90° to the foyer, extending across the site parallel to the main road. To maximise the space, the projection booth was built into an exterior balcony protruding form the building above Three Close Lane, supported by large concrete brackets. It was accessed by an external iron staircase to reduce the fire risk of bringing flammable nitrate film reels into the theatre. A joke shared among local residents was that the architect had forgotten to add a projection room and that this box was added later. As space was at a premium in the circle, a café and dining room was located on the ground floor behind the stalls and the foyer, with the result that the circle had more seats than the stalls.

The interior design of the Rex included a variety of ornate features; the designer is not known but it is assumed to be the work of Mollo and Egan who collaborated with Nye on other cinema interiors. The Rex interior featured stylised floral stucco friezes around the dining room, a striking decorated foyer ceiling rose, and the nautical flavour set by Nye's dining room porthole windows was continued with the addition of scallop shell-shaped light fittings and stucco waves in the auditorium. The main screen itself was surrounded by an ornate proscenium, with Art Deco floral designs obscuring the ventilation grilles.

Since the cinema's dereliction and later re-opening, some of the original features have been lost; the chandelier and the ticket booth were removed after the 1976 Zetter takeover. The auditorium was divided in 1976 into two circle studio screens, while the stalls were used as a bingo hall. However, despite these alterations, most of the original fabric and decoration survived the years of decline, enough to merit spot-listing by English Heritage in 1988, and in 1990 the Department of the Environment recommended that the Rex be preserved.

Following the 2004 redevelopment, the refurbished Rex is smaller, having 350 seats compared to the original capacity of 1100 (due to the larger leg-room and provision of swivel chairs and cocktail tables). The refurbishment was sympathetic to the cinema's Art Deco heritage, notably with the installation of a new chandelier and new period style mirrors. The work also brought about a major change to the building by separating the entire ground floor from the main cinema operation and converting it into a bar and restaurant. The decorated entrance foyer and dining room are now home to The Gatsby bar and restaurant, named in homage to the 1949 film The Great Gatsby whose poster hangs above the bar, in front of the former cinema entrance at the top of the (now disused) staircase.

Cinema audiences now gain access to the cinema, via a staircase and side entrance, to a more modest entrance foyer and box office which are located in an area underneath the stalls on the first floor. The ground floor stalls, accessed via stairs in the auditorium, are now laid out with lounge chairs and tables.

A plaque inside the cinema, unveiled on 14 February 1979 by actress Jane Asher, commemorates the site's association with J.M. Barrie and Peter Pan.

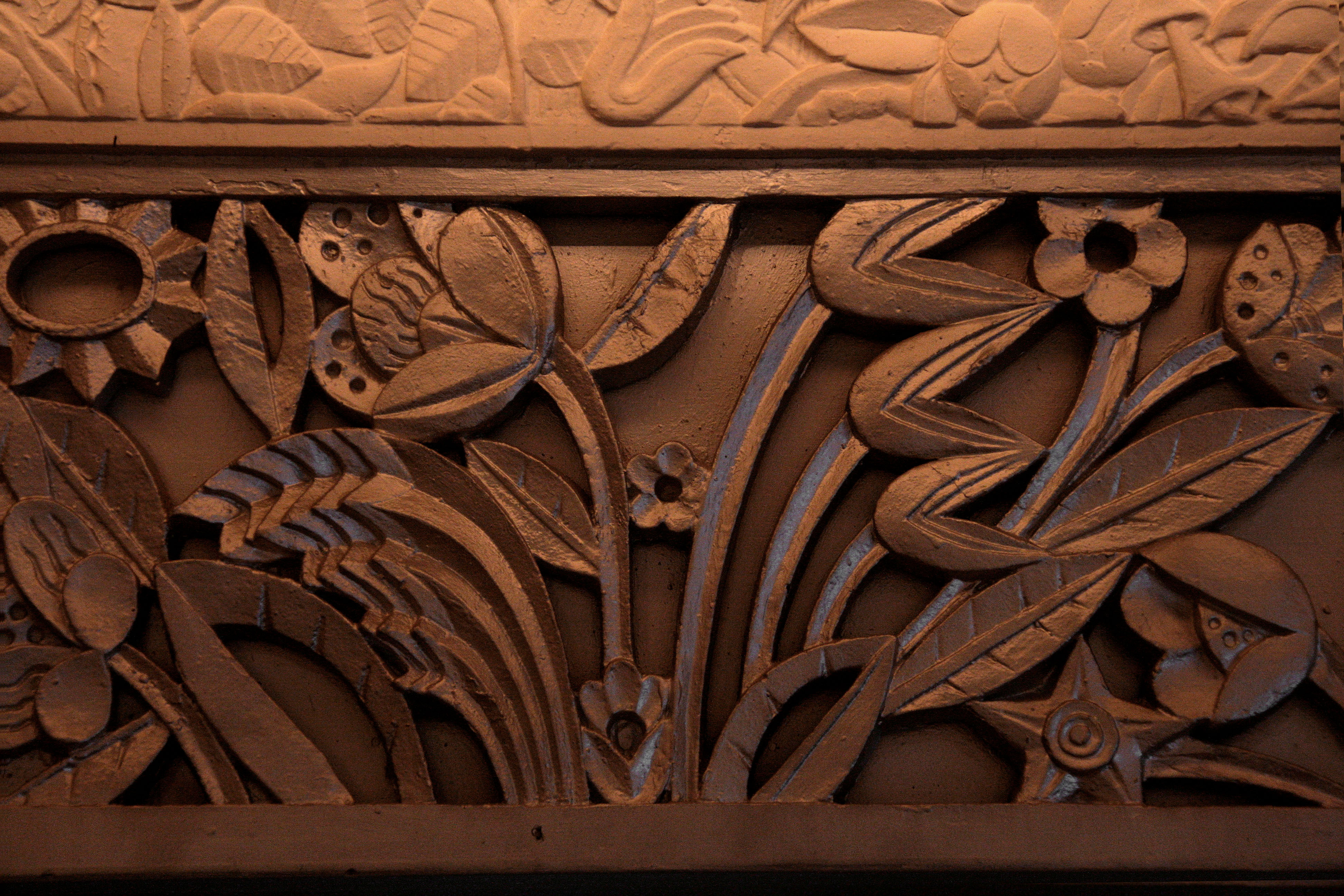
Detail of the decorated frieze

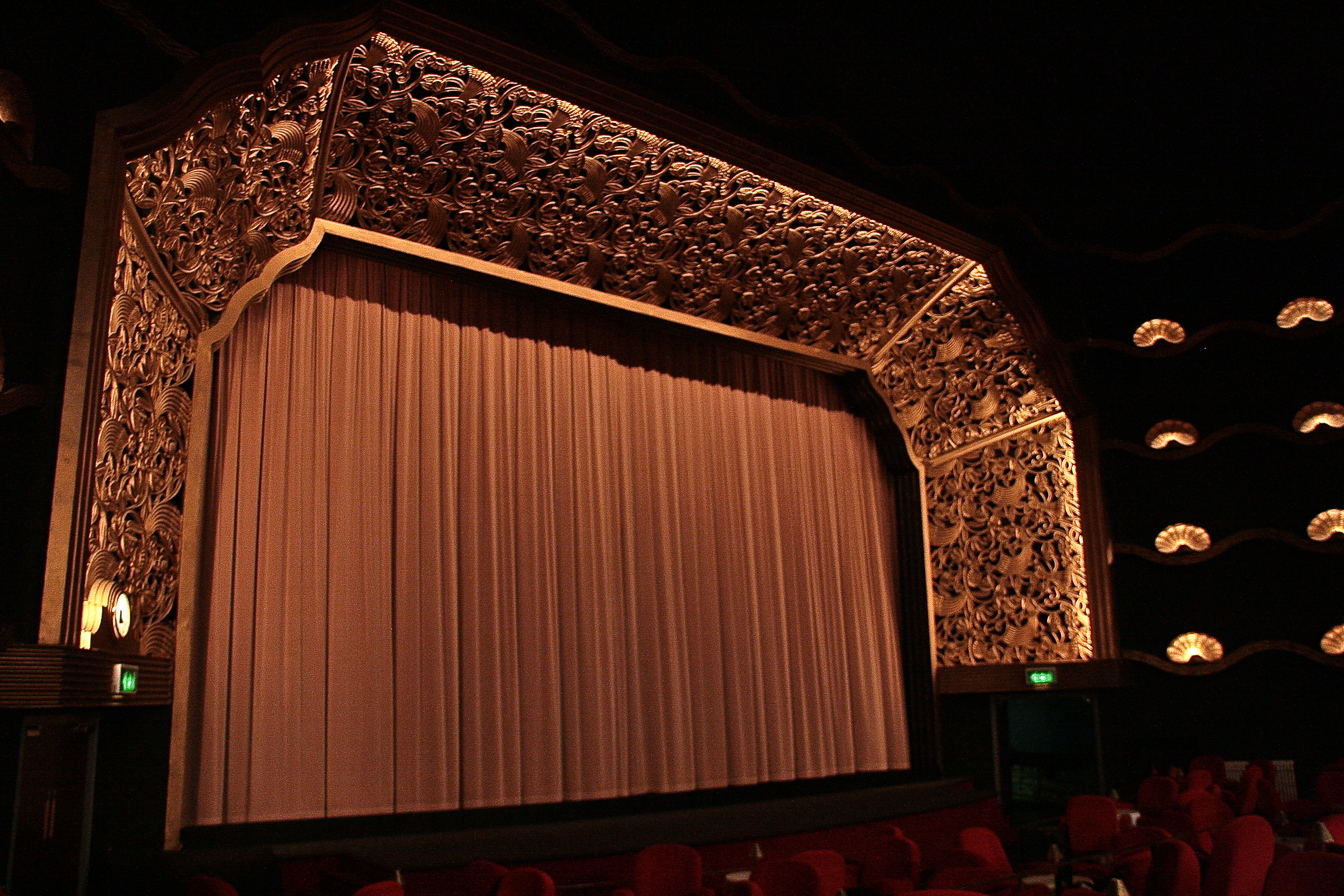
The decorated proscenium arch

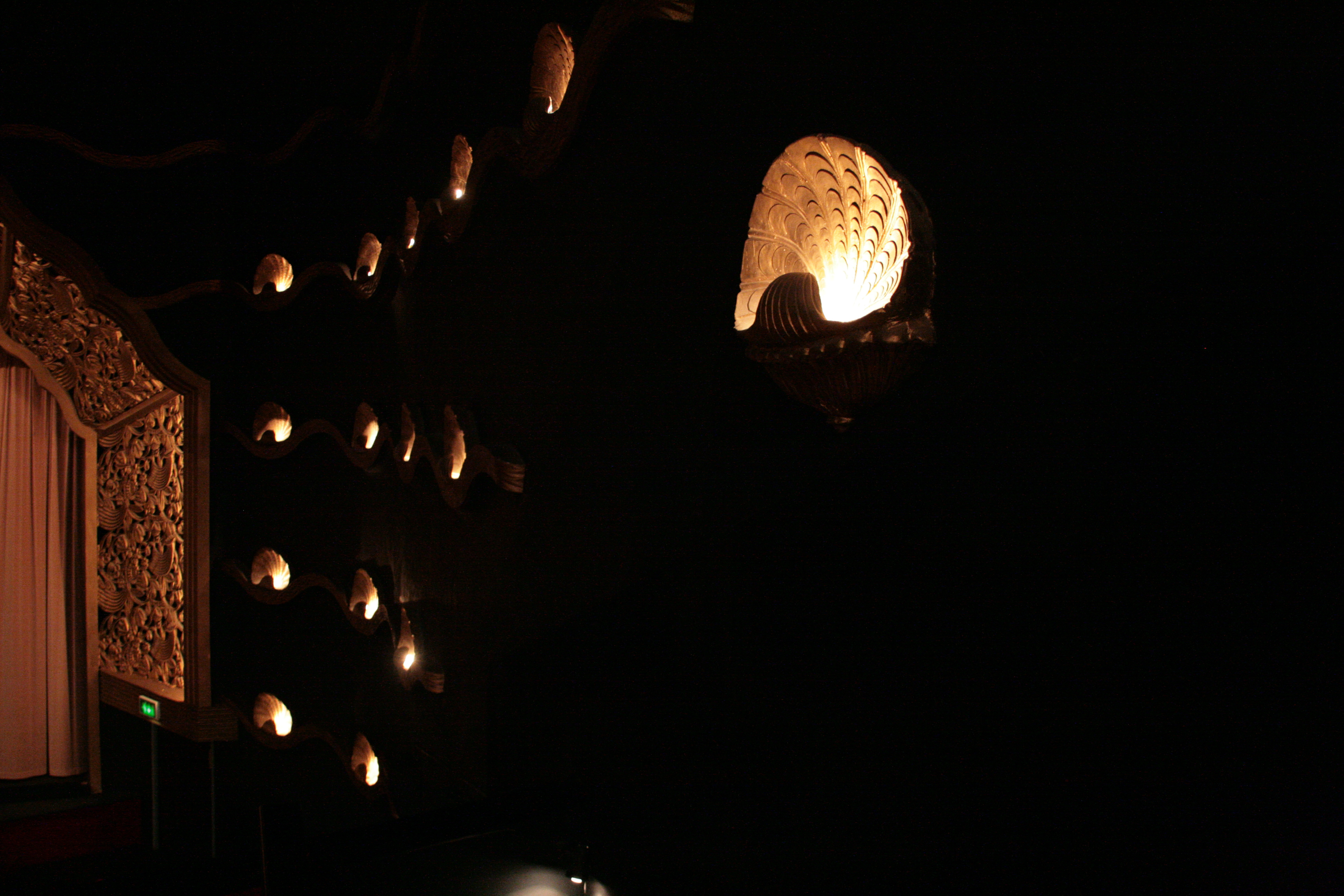
Close-up of a scallop-shell wall light

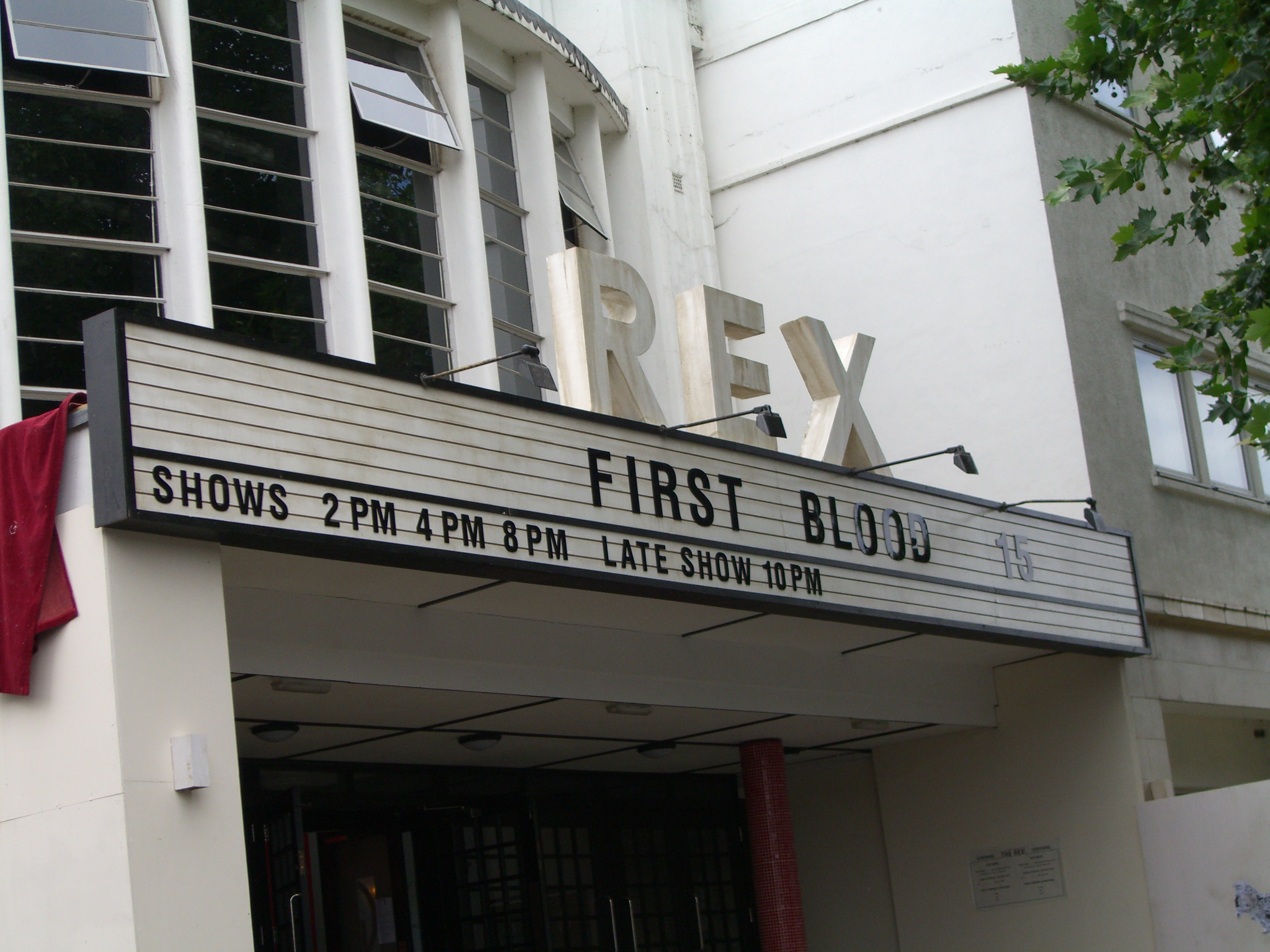
Entrance to the Rex in 2006
