= Newton Abbot railway station =

Railway station in Devon, England

Newton Abbot
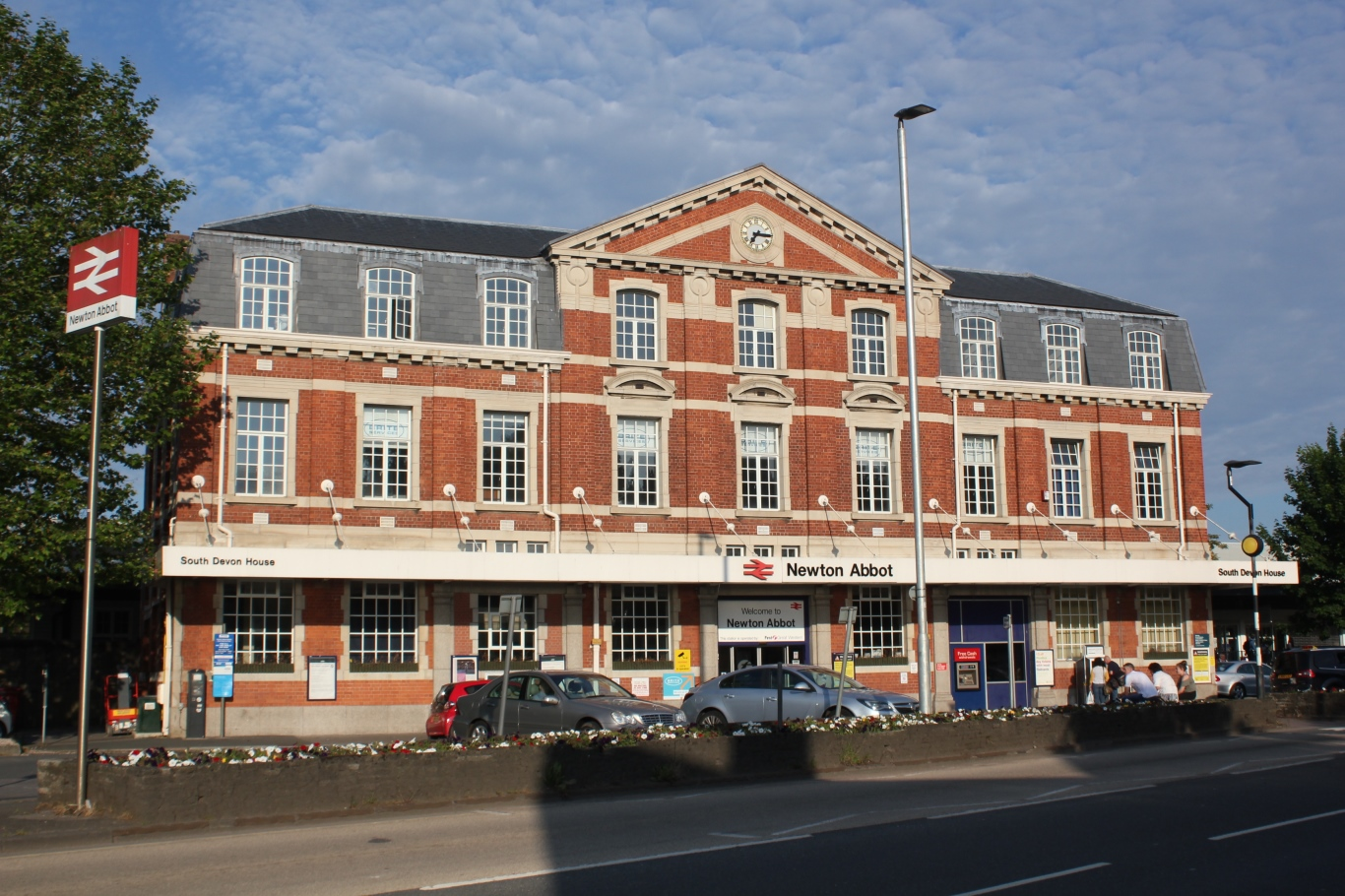
- The station building of 1927 by Percy Emerson Culverhouse

General information
- Location: Newton Abbot, Teignbridge, England
- Coordinates: 50.5300°N 3.5997°W
- Grid reference: SX867712
- Manager: Great Western Railway
- Platforms: 3

Other information
- Station code: NTA
- Classification: DfT category C1

History
- Original company: South Devon Railway
- Pre-grouping: Great Western Railway
- Post-grouping: Great Western Railway

Key dates
- 1846: Station opened
- 1848: Torquay branch opened
- 1866: Moretonhampstead line opened
- 1927: Station rebuilt
- 1940: Station bombed
- 1959: Moretonhampstead line closed
- 1987: Station resignalled

Passengers
- 2021/22: ▲0.977 million
- Interchange: ▲0.303 million
- 2022/23: ▲1.155 million
- Interchange: ▲0.441 million
- 2023/24: ▲1.183 million
- Interchange: ▲0.463 million
- 2024/25: ▲1.335 million
- Interchange: ▲0.515 million
- 2025/26: ▲1.440 million
- Interchange: ▲0.521 million
Location
Notes
- Passenger statistics from the Office of Rail and Road

Newton Abbot railway station serves the market town of Newton Abbot, in Devon, England. It is at milepost 214 on the Exeter–Plymouth line. It was opened as Newton railway station by the South Devon Railway in 1846 but was renamed Newton Abbot in 1877 by the Great Western Railway which had taken over the South Devon company.

The station is managed by Great Western Railway, which also provides services along with CrossCountry. It is the junction for the line to Paignton but, for many years, it was also the junction for the branch line to Moretonhampstead and the site of a large locomotive workshop.

== History ==
=== Broad gauge to 1892 ===
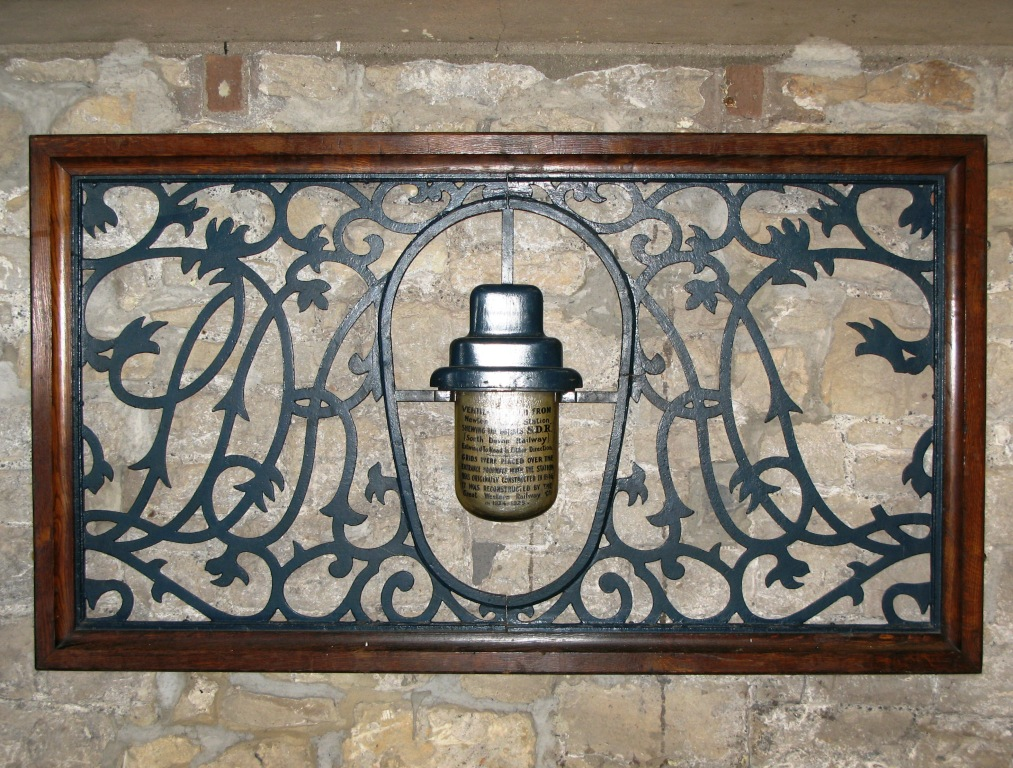
A decorative screen with SDR initials from above the door of the original station

The station was opened by the South Devon Railway Company on 30 December 1846, when its 7 ft (2,134 mm) broad gauge line was extended from Teignmouth. It was opened through to Totnes on 20 June 1847 and a branch to Torquay was added on 18 December 1848. The Moretonhampstead and South Devon Railway opened its branch line on 26 June 1866.

Approaching the station from the town along Queen Street, people first saw the large goods shed. On the opposite side of the line was the pumping house for the atmospheric railway system that powered the trains for a short while. The passenger station was situated to the south of these buildings. It originally consisted to two, later three, small train sheds covering separate platforms for trains running in each direction to Exeter St Davids, Plymouh and Torquay. It was rebuilt in 1861 as a single station, with a larger train shed covering all three platforms.

On 1 February 1876, the South Devon Railway, which had already amalgamated with the Moretonhampstead company, was amalgamated into the Great Western Railway. The station was originally known as just 'Newton', but this was changed to 'Newton Abbot' on 1 March 1877.

The last broad gauge train ran on 20 May 1892, after which all the lines in the area were converted to 4 ft 8 1/2 in (1,435 mm) standard gauge over the space of a weekend. The workshops at Newton Abbot played a part in converting broad gauge wagons to standard gauge over the following months. £20,00 was set aside for alterations following the gauge conversion, most of which was for new locomotive workshops.

Preceding station	Historical railways	Following station
Teignmouth	Great Western Railway (Exeter–Plymouth line)	Totnes
Teignmouth	Great Western Railway (Newton Abbot–Kingswear line)	Kingskerswell
Teigngrace Halt	Great Western Railway (Newton Abbot–Moretonhampstead line}	Terminus

=== Developments up to 1947 ===
Plans were put forward to rebuild the station with four platforms, but World War I delayed the plans. The goods facilities were moved onto the Moretonhampstead branch line on 12 June 1911 and some sidings were laid at Hackney on 17 December 1911, to replace those near the engine shed. These alterations paved the way for the expansion of the station following the war, with the rebuilt station being opened eventually by Lord Mildmay of Flete on 11 April 1927. The station, built to the designs of the Chief Architect of the Great Western Railway, Percy Emerson Culverhouse, now faced the town along Queen Street rather than the old wooden goods shed. The station now had four through tracks arranged around two island platforms, plus goods line on either side. This resulted in passengers having to use a footbridge to reach the platforms. An old broad gauge 0-4-0 locomotive, Tiny, was put on display on the new southbound platform to provide a link with the past.

The southbound platform had to be rebuilt again, following an air raid on 20 August 1940 during World War II. Six bombs were dropped (one failed to explode), killing 14 people. Extra tracks were laid on either side of the station in 1941 to help the flow of goods trains during World War II. Hackney Yard and the locomotive depot were expanded in 1943.

=== British Rail 1948 to 1996 ===
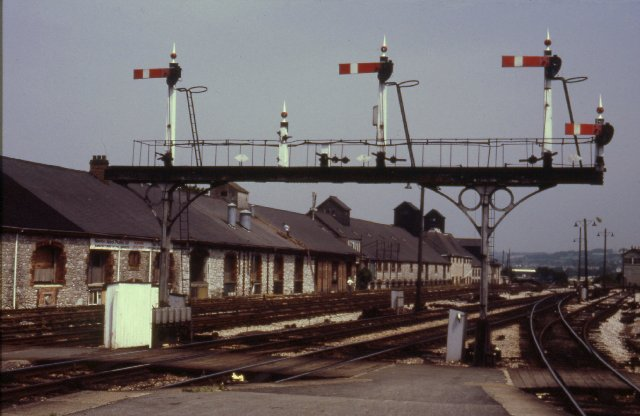
One of the signal gantries that was removed in 1987

The Moretonhampstead line lost its passenger trains on 28 February 1959. Goods trains were cut back to Bovey from 6 April 1964 and were run no further than Heathfield from 6 July 1970. The last regular traffic ran in 1996.

Reducing traffic levels since the 1950s and resignalling in 1987 allowed the station to be rebuilt with easier passenger access routes. The last trains used the platform 4 on 24 April 1987; the removal of the platform allowed a level entrance to be opened from the road and an extended car park to be built. The loop lines, that allowed fast trains to pass the station without passing a platform, were also removed. Resignalling was completed over the following week and bank holiday weekend. Full operation was restored from 5 May 1987 and is now controlled from the panel signal box at Exeter. A new junction was installed for the Paignton branch and the signals now allow trains to run either way on each track. It was also at about this time that Tiny was removed from its position on the platform and moved to Buckfastleigh, where it is displayed in the museum of the South Devon Railway Trust.

=== Since privatisation ===
The remaining section of the Moretonhampstead line was taken out of use in 2009, when 'temporary stop blocks' were placed on the line 53 chains (1.1 km) from the junction at Newton Abbot.

British Rail removed ticket barriers at most stations including Newton Abbot, but new ticket barriers were installed by Great Western Railway in August 2017.

== Description ==
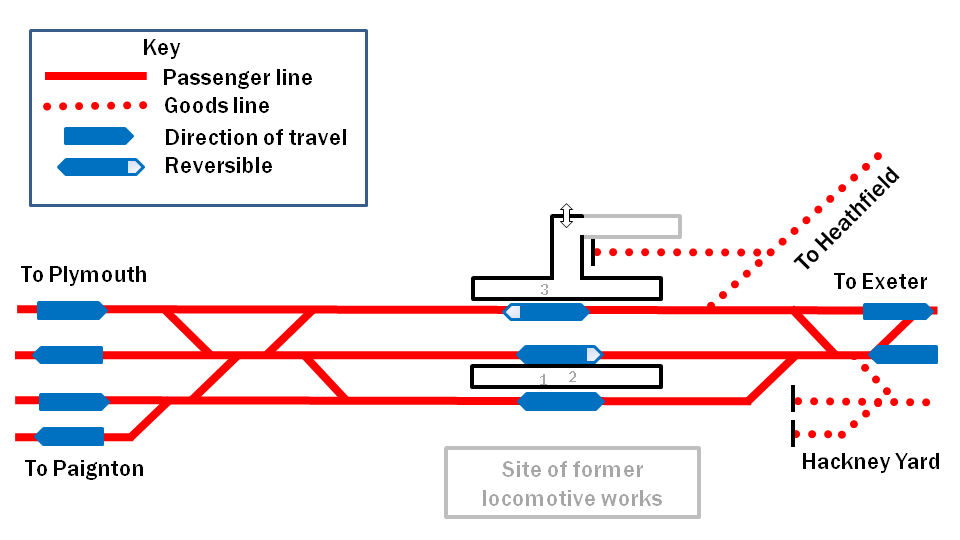
Track layout in 2009

Newton Abbot is 214 miles 5 chains (345 km) from London Paddington via Box Tunnel.

There are now just three tracks in use for passenger trains. The entrance is on platform 3. A wide footbridge links this to platforms 1 and 2. There is a ticket office along with car and bicycle parking.

== Services ==
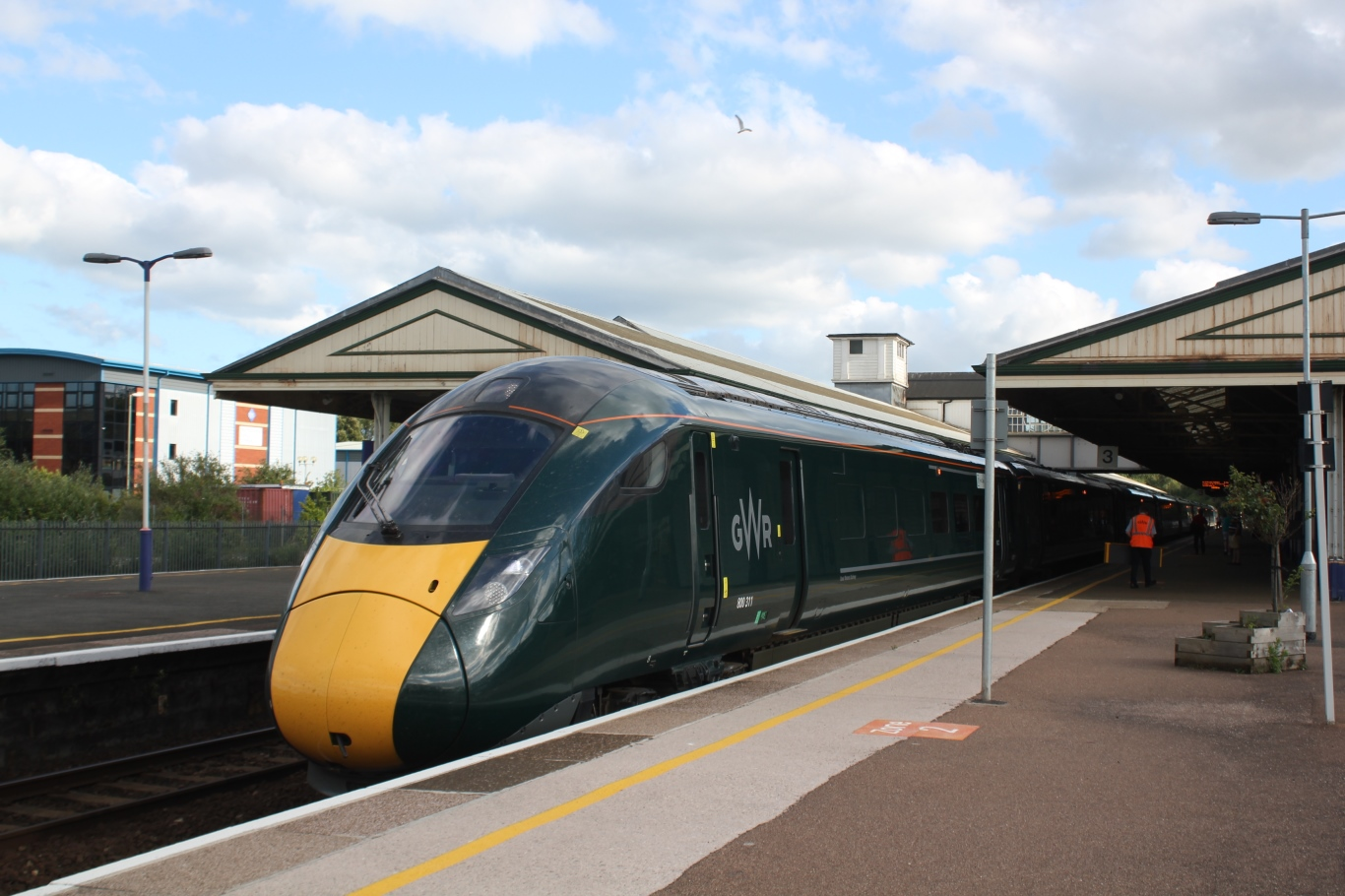
A GWR Class 800 at the station

The station is served by two train operating companies, Great Western Railway (GWR) and CrossCountry (XC).

The typical off-peak GWR services each hour are one inter-city service on the London Paddington route via Exeter St Davids and one regional service to and from Exeter St Davids which may continue to serve Bristol Temple Meads and Cardiff Central. These services mostly continue westwards to Plymouth or further to Penzance but a few London services run to and from Paignton instead. The overnight Night Riviera service runs between London Paddington and Penzance. A local service typically runs twice each hour between Exmouth via Exeter St Davids and Paignton.

The XC service is mostly between Plymouth and Edinburgh Waverley but many trains continue to other destinations including Penzance in the west and Glasgow Central or Dundee in Scotland. There is also a limited XC service between Paignton and Manchester Piccadilly.

Preceding station	National Rail	Following station
Totnes	Great Western Railway Exeter–Plymouth line	Exeter St Davids
Totnes	CrossCountry	Exeter St Davids
Torre	Great Western Railway Riviera Line	Teignmouth
Torquay	CrossCountry Riviera Line (Limited service)	Teignmouth

== Beyond the passenger station ==
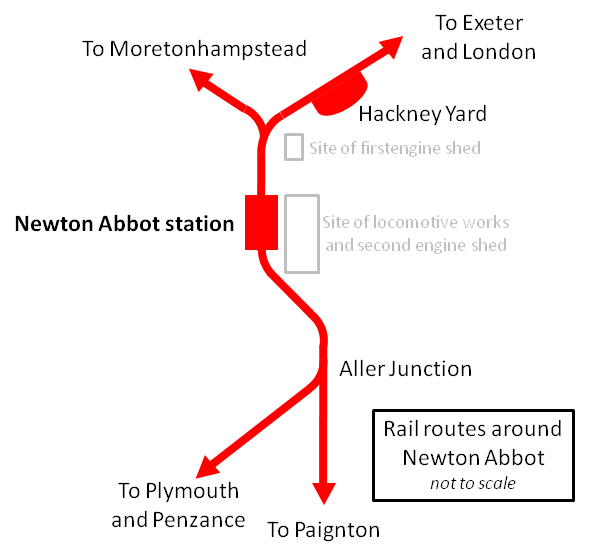
Railway routes around Newton Abbot in 2009

=== Hackney Yard ===
Located at 50.5372°N 3.5921°W

Changes were made to the goods facilities at Newton Abbot in 1911 to make more space for the passenger station. The goods shed was moved to a 'New Yard' alongside the Moretonhampstead line which was opened for traffic on 12 June, and a marshalling yard was opened at Hackney, just north of the station, on 17 December. The marshalling yard was enlarged in 1913 when further goods sidings by the passenger station were removed. The sidings were closed to scheduled traffic on 10 January 1971.

=== Engine shed and works ===
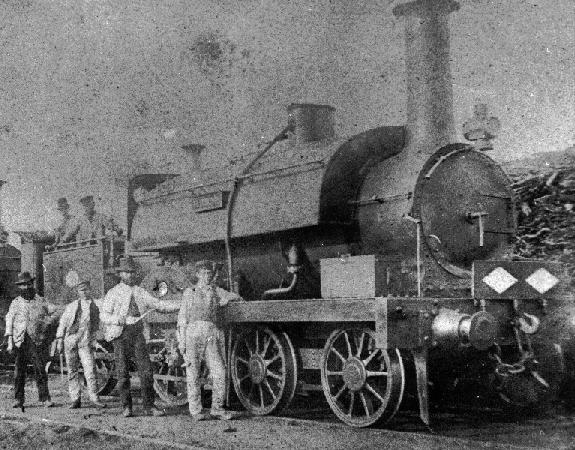
SDR 4-4-0ST Heron

Located at 50.5301°N 3.5979°W

The first engine shed had been established on the east side of the track at the north end of the station, between the river and the station, by 1848. It measured about 75 ft × 35 ft (23 m × 11 m). A locomotive workshop was also provided on the east side of the line opposite the goods shed and further workshops for maintaining carriages and wagons were added at the south end of the site. An old 0-4-0 locomotive, Tiny, was installed in the workshops to power the machinery. When it was no longer required for this role, it was restored and put on display on the station platform. It has since been moved to the railway museum at Buckfastleigh and is the only original British 7 ft (2,134 mm) broad gauge locomotive that survives.

The original engine shed was closed in 1893 and replaced by a new six-track shed at the south end of the workshops. This was 100 ft × 150 ft (30 m × 46 m) and had a 47,000-imperial-gallon (210,000 L) water tank above it.

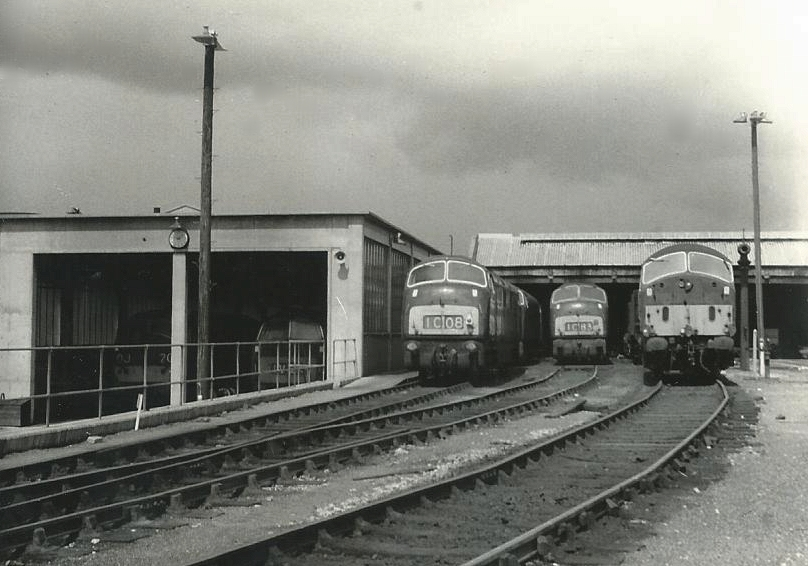
The diesel locomotive shed in 1966

Designated and designed as the major shed for the region, it was constructed as a heavy maintenance repair shop. The associated locomotive factory had access to heavy lifting equipment and engineering facilities to maintain, repair and overhaul all types of GWR locomotive. Locomotives could be put into the factory roads by means of a traversing table at the east (Exeter and London) end. The last British Rail (BR) steam engine to be overhauled in the workshops was ex-GWR 4500 Class, no. 4566, outshopped on 15 July 1966. Although some steam engines belonging to the private Dart Valley Railway company were overhauled in the factory, after it had closed to BR work and the old steam shed was also used to do some work on these privately owned engines.

After the decision to switch to diesel traction, the site was completely rebuilt in 1962 to accommodate diesels, including the Warship Class that were used on the Exeter to Waterloo services. The factory was reformed to provide four roads with servicing pits and cab level platforms, providing facilities to repair eight locomotives at the same time. Access was via the existing traversing table. A daily servicing and fuelling point was built beside the old steam shed; it was this that provided the main facility after the factory closed in 1970.

Diesel multiple units were serviced in another open ended shed next to the carriage cleaning tracks; this shed was used subsequently to repair the electric train heating and air conditioning on the new Mark 3 coaching stock.

The diesel repair sheds were closed in 1970, although a locomotive and coach servicing/fuel facility remained until 1981, when servicing was transferred to Laira Traction Maintenance Depot where the new InterCity 125s were maintained. An industrial estate now occupies the site. Two of the works' buildings survived into the 21st century however, one burned down on 21 October 2018.

Newton Abbot used to provide the locomotives for sub-sheds at Ashburton, Kingsbridge and Moretonhampstead. As the principal depot for the Newton Abbot Division, the workshops undertook heavy maintenance on locomotives based at Exeter and Taunton. Before 1963, when a new Plymouth Division was created, the Newton Abbot Division also included Laira, St Blazey, Truro and Penzance.

The Great Western Railway introduced alphabetic codes to identify the allocation of locomotives in the early years of the twentieth century. Initially used only in documents, they were later painted onto the locomotives. Newton Abbot was given code NA. A different numeric code was used in later documents, Newton Abbot being depot 133. British Railways introduced its national shed codes in 1950 which resulted in the NA painted on locomotives being replaced by a cast plate showing 83A. This numeric system was replaced by two-letter codes when the TOPS computer system was introduced in May 1973 and this saw Newton Abbot reverting to NA.

=== Aller Junction ===
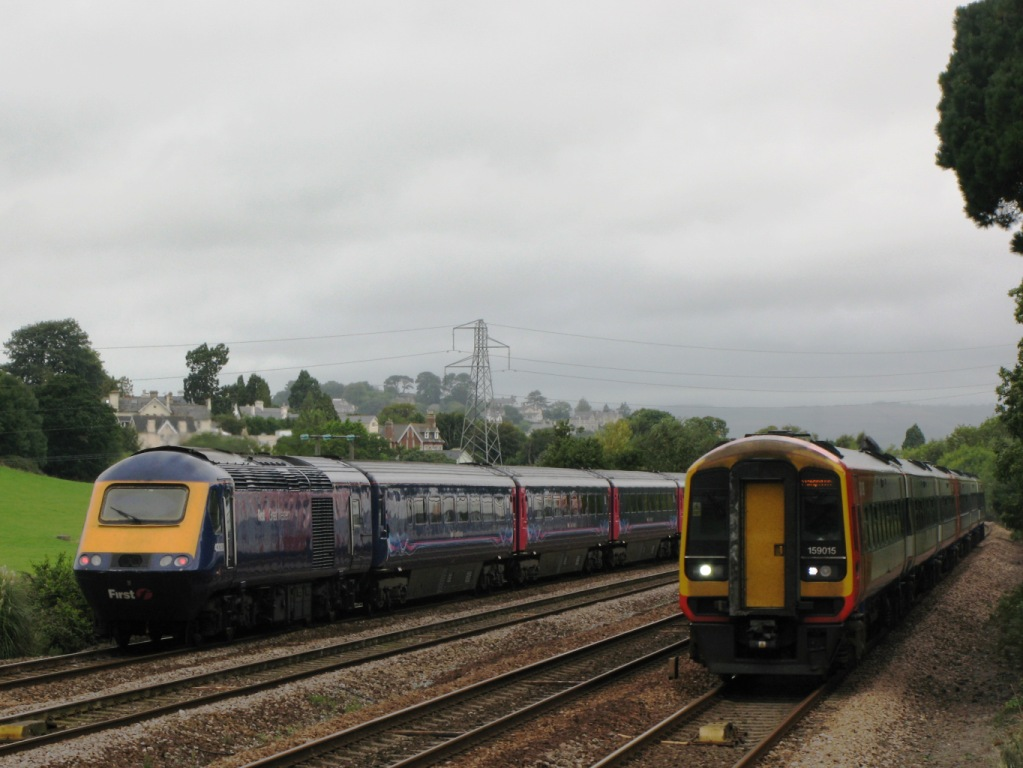
A Class 43 (HST) (left) from Plymouth passes a Class 159 to Paignton at Aller

Located at 50.5149°N 3.5887°W

The branch to Torquay originally left the main line in the station area and ran parallel with the Plymouth line for 1 mile (1.6 km), before the latter swung off into the hills at Aller. A proper junction, known as Torquay Junction, was put here on 29 January 1855 as the two single lines had now become part of the double-track line from Newton to Totnes; trains on the single-track Torquay branch running on the correct line between the junction and the station.

In 1874, the branch was extended to the station, running parallel with the Plymouth line as it had done before 1855. There were now three tracks on this section but, on 22 May 1876, the branch was doubled as far as Kingskerswell, which meant a fourth track was added. The tracks were grouped: down branch, up branch, down main and up main.

In 1914, along with the rebuilding of the station, it was proposed to install a flying junction at Aller to speed up the passage of trains coming off the branch. The plans were shelved due to World War I but, on 24 May 1925, a junction was once again installed where the two lines diverged, now known as 'Aller Junction'. The four tracks were now grouped by direction of travel: down relief, down main, up relief and up main. Trains for either line could use either track between the junction and the station, but trains to and from the branch generally used the 'relief' lines. This meant that trains coming off the branch had to cross over the line used by trains going towards Plymouth, which could cause delays at busy times. The junction was moved during the 1987 resignalling to a new position about 0.5 miles (0.8 km) closer to the station. Trains can now run to and from the branch on a single line connection with their own platform or cross over to the Plymouth–Exeter tracks on either side of the station, as may be convenient.

A private siding was opened on the Torquay branch in 1866 for sand traffic from a nearby pit; it was removed in 1964.

== Accidents and incidents ==
Newton Abbot has proved to be an accident-prone station. On 22 August 1851, the locomotive Brigand was derailed and Switchman Bidgood had to pay one pound towards its repairs.

The investigation into a collision in August 1875 revealed that it was normal practice at Newton to ignore the signal that controlled movements from the siding to the main line; as a result, it was decided to interlock the signals and points here, one of the first such installations to be authorised on the South Devon Railway.

Four wagons were derailed on 21 October 1892 in the siding at Aller Junction. The engine which was shunting them also derailed and fell on its side.

In more recent times, a collision occurred on 25 March 1994 when a Class 158 diesel multiple unit working a Paignton to Cardiff Central service ran into the back of a Class 43 standing in the platform with a Penzance to Edinburgh Waverley train;

In March 1997, a train from London Paddington derailed by a wheel bearing failure on one of its coaches as it approached the station.
