= Totnes railway station =

Railway station in Devon, England

Totnes
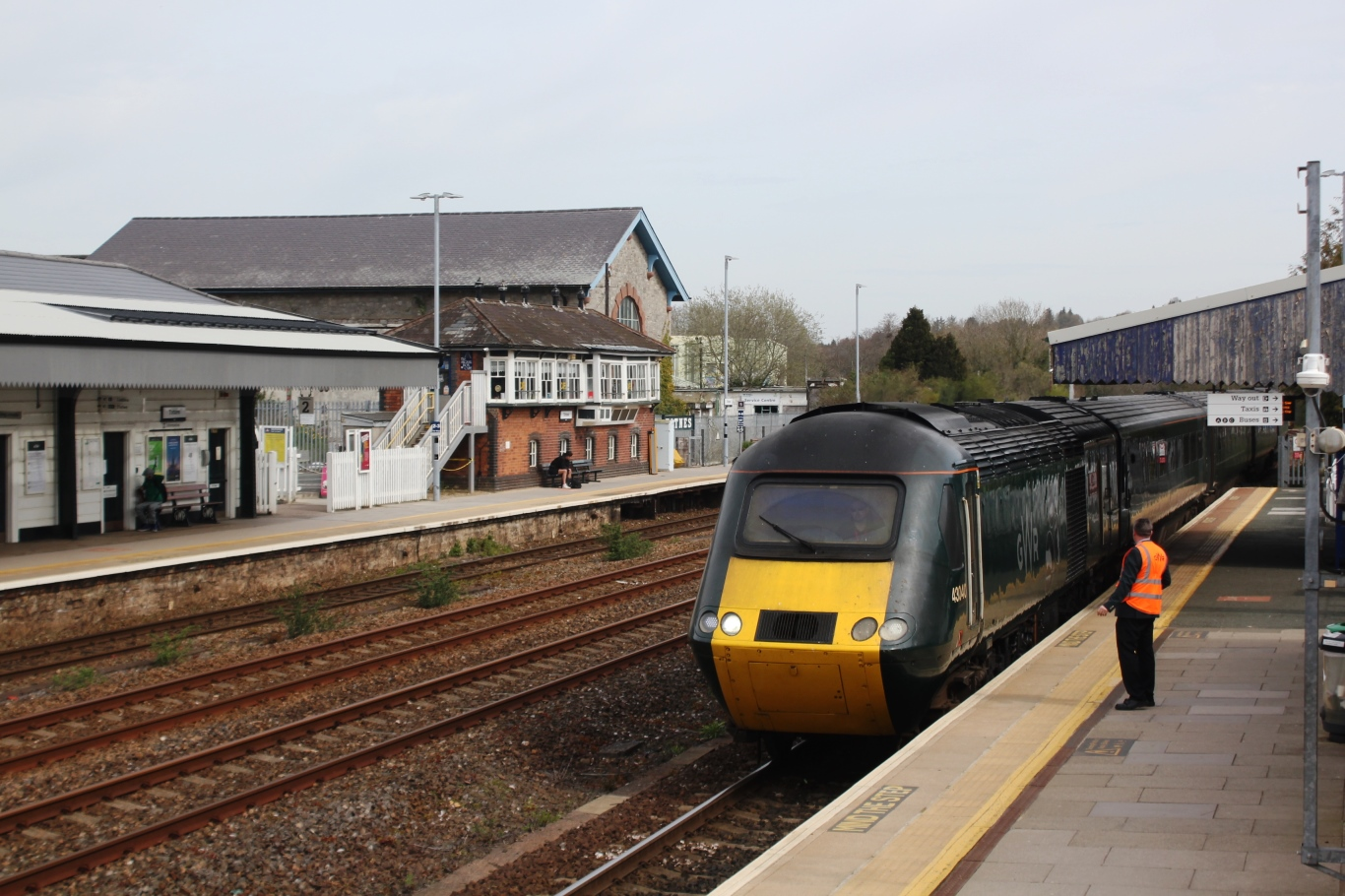

General information
- Location: Totnes, South Hams; England
- Coordinates: 50.4356°N 3.6887°W
- Grid reference: SX801609
- Manager: Great Western Railway
- Platforms: 2
- Tracks: 4

Other information
- Station code: TOT
- Classification: DfT category D

History
- Original company: South Devon Railway
- Pre-grouping: Great Western Railway
- Post-grouping: Great Western Railway

Key dates
- 1847: Opened
- 1872: Ashburton branch opened
- 1942: Station bombed
- 1958: Ashburton branch closed

Passengers
- 2021/22: ▲0.576 million
- 2022/23: ▲0.687 million
- 2023/24: ▲0.710 million
- 2024/25: ▲0.797 million
- 2025/26: ▲0.837 million
Location
Notes
- Passenger statistics from the Office of Rail and Road

Totnes railway station serves the town of Totnes in Devon, England. It was opened by the South Devon Railway Company in 1847. Situated on the Exeter to Plymouth Line, it is located 222 miles 66 chains (222.83 mi; 358.6 km) down the line from London Paddington via Box.

== History ==
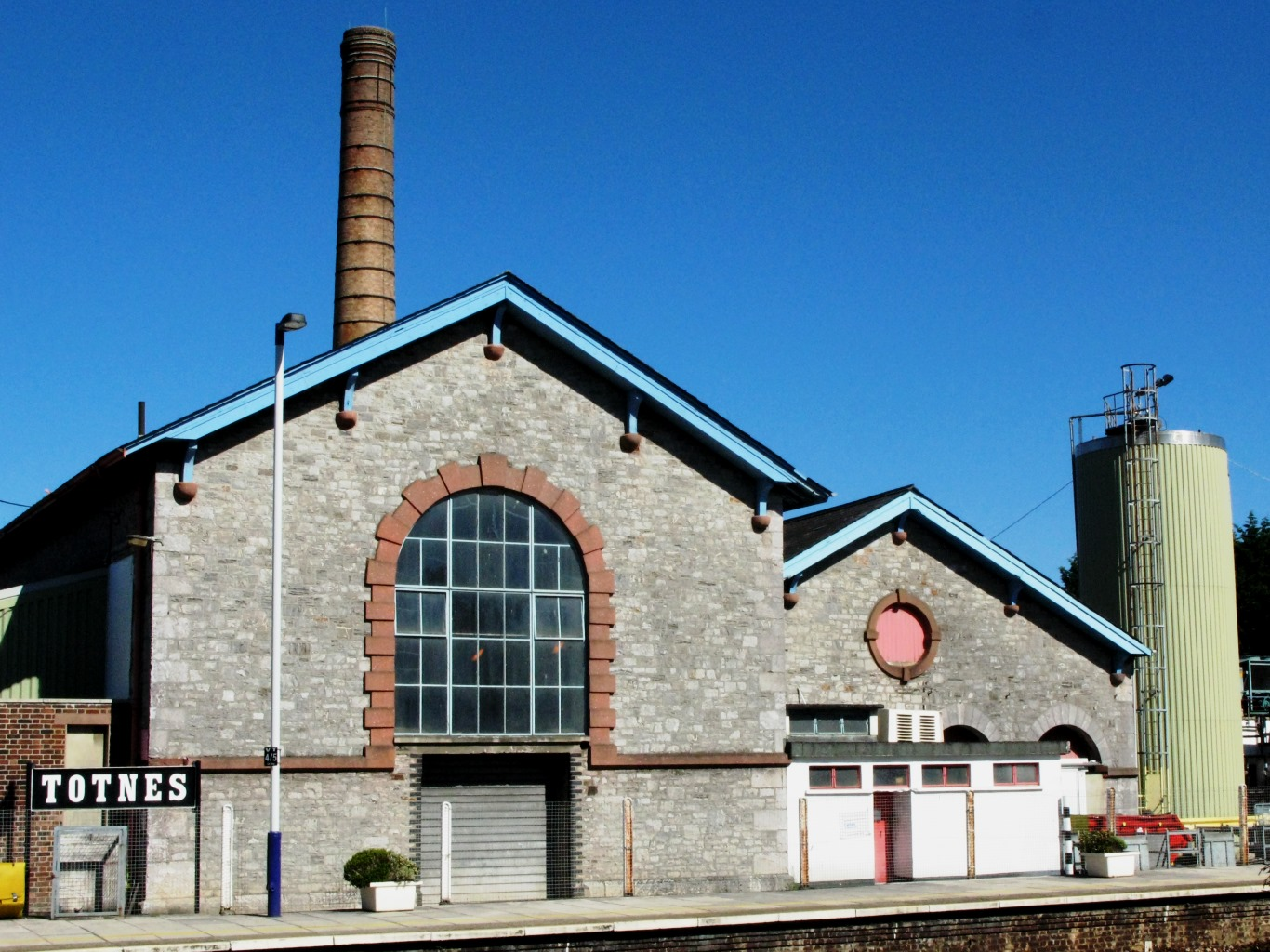
The engine house

Totnes railway station was built by the South Devon Railway Company and opened on 20 July 1847 when trains started to run on the line from Newton, as Newton Abbot was known at the time. It was a terminus until 5 May 1848 when trains started to run through to Plymouth, initially using a temporary terminus at Laira. The line was intended to be operated by atmospheric power and an engine house to provide power was built behind the eastbound platform, although it was never brought into use.The two platform tracks were covered by wooden train sheds, an engine shed was built south of the line beyond the westbound platform, and a goods shed was erected between this platform and the River Dart which the line crossed on a viaduct just to the east of the platforms.

Totnes became the junction for the Buckfastleigh, Totnes and South Devon Railway's line to Ashburton when it opened on 1 May 1872. This included a freight branch line to the quay at Totnes near the Plain. The South Devon Railway was amalgamated with the Great Western Railway on 1 February 1876 and the Buckfastleigh company was absorbed in 1897. Trains were suspended on 21 and 22 May 1892 while the original 7 ft (2,134 mm) broad gauge tracks were replaced by those of 4 ft 8 1/2 in (1,435 mm) standard gauge. The engine shed was closed in 1904 although the turntable was retained for five more years.

The westbound platform was damaged during an air raid in World War II on 21 October 1942. The Ashburton branch train was damaged in the attack, two people killed and two more injured.

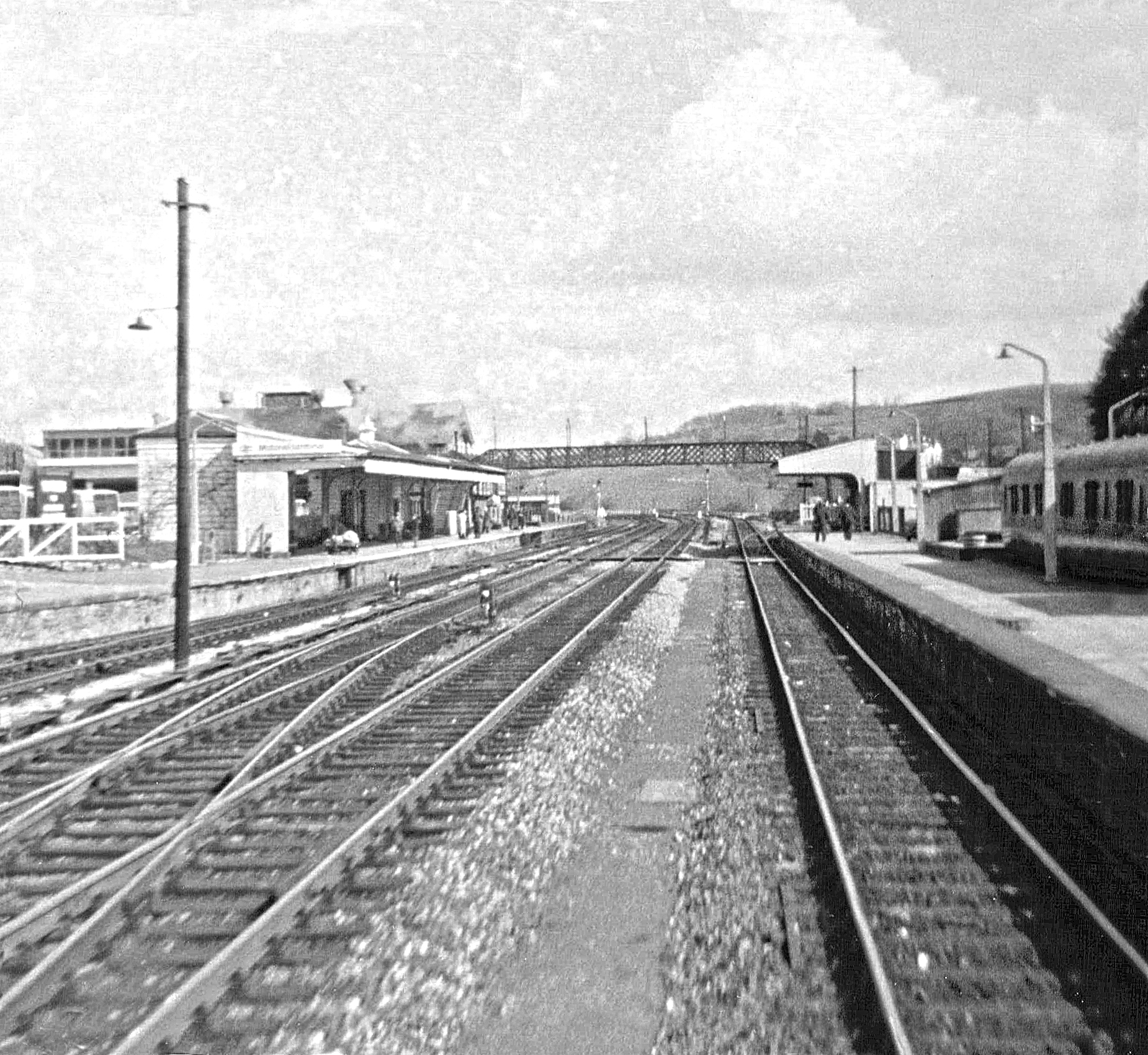
Totnes station in 1970

On 1 January 1948 the Great Western Railway was nationalised to become the Western Region of British Railways. Passenger services to Ashburton were withdrawn on 3 November 1958 and that line closed entirely on 10 September 1962. A few months earlier, on 14 April 1962, a fire had destroyed the main buildings on the westbound platform at Totnes. A new building was provided but this was replaced by new facilities which opened on 21 October 1983.

General goods traffic was withdrawn on 14 June 1965 although coal continued to be handled until 4 December 1967 and milk until 1980, from the dairy that incorporates the building intended for the atmospheric engines.

From 5 April 1985 to 2 September 1987 trains on the Buckfastleigh line, now the South Devon Railway heritage line, operated into the station. A footbridge across the River Dart was opened on 30 September 1993 which now allows people to walk to Totnes (Riverside) railway station to join the heritage trains to Buckfastleigh.

The 1887-built footbridge that spanned the station and gave access to the operating floor of the signal box was destroyed on 18 October 1987 when hit by a crane engaged in track renewals. It was replaced by a new bridge which was in turn replaced by a newer footbridge and lifts in 2019.

=== Accidents and incidents ===
On 13 March 1860 the boiler of the locomotive Tornado exploded while standing at Totnes, killing the driver.

On 23 April 1915, 14 men were riding a partly loaded, low-sided wagon which was loose-shunted onto a siding. The screw brakes were applied under the direction of ganger JJ King, however, due to a brake failure, the wagon hit the buffers, injuring 8 of the 14 men riding.

== Layout and facilities ==
The railway approaches from Newton Abbot in the north-east runs south-westerly through the station and then swings to the west on a right-hand curve, which is the start of the steep climb up to Rattery. There are four tracks through the station with platforms alongside the outer pair.

The modern brick-built station building is on the south-east side of the station, nearest the town. This is the platform for trains to Plymouth and Penzance. Trains to Newton Abbot, Exeter St Davids and beyond depart from the opposite platform, which can be reached by a footbridge on the south-west side of the entrance to the platform. The old signal box on the platform used by trains to Newton Abbot serves as the station café.

The station has a car park, a ticket office and ticket machine, toilets and bicycle parking. Both platforms, which have step-free access, have live departure boards.

== Passenger volume ==
Passenger Volume at Totnes
	2002–03	2004–05	2005–06	2006–07	2007–08	2008–09	2009–10	2010–11	2011–12	2012–13	2013–14	2014–15	2015–16	2016–17	2017–18	2018–19	2019–20	2020–21	2021–22	2022–23
Entries and exits	316,214	353,580	384,375	433,400	484,465	541,216	563,906	592,720	639,944	662,822	627,810	657,754	657,370	667,730	700,038	696,226	725,038	225,454	575,630	687,394

The statistics cover twelve month periods that start in April.

== Services ==
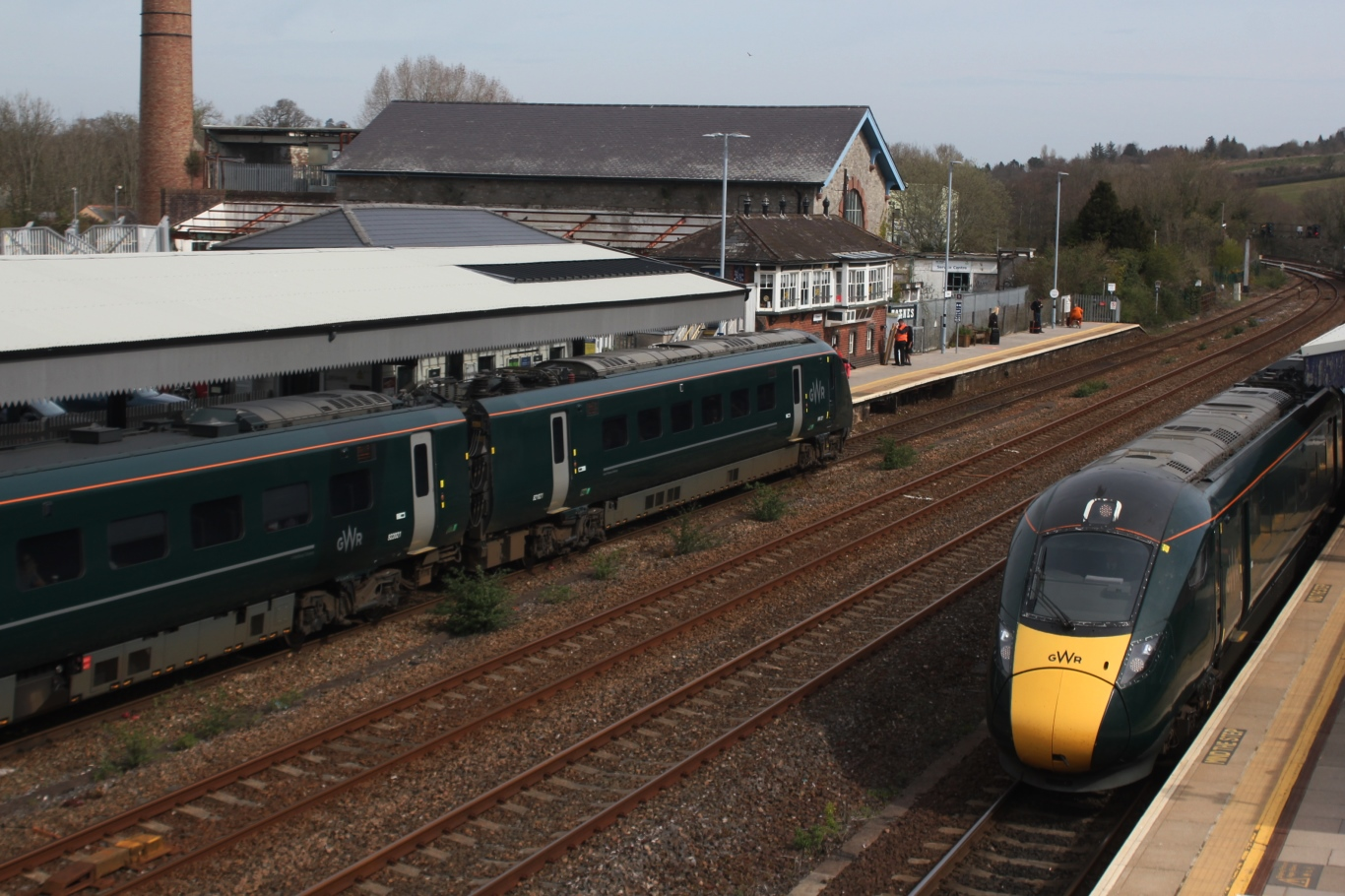
Great Western railway 'InterCity Express Trains' in the platform tracks with the signal box café and old engine house behind.

Services are operated by two train operating companies:

- Great Western Railway provides main line services between London Paddington, Plymouth and Penzance. Service frequencies to and from London Paddington are approximately hourly.
- CrossCountry operate trains to Penzance, Plymouth, Bristol Temple Meads, Birmingham New Street, York, Newcastle, Edinburgh Waverley and Aberdeen.

Preceding station	National Rail	Following station
Newton Abbot	Great Western Railway; Exeter–Plymouth line	Ivybridge
Newton Abbot	CrossCountry; Scottish Lowlands to Devon and Cornwall	Plymouth
	Heritage railways	
Interchange with Totnes (Riverside) on the South Devon Railway

== Signalling ==
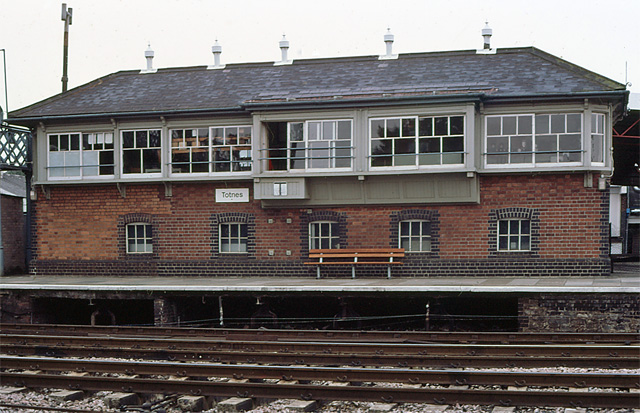
Totnes Signal Box in September 1981

In 1923 the current structure was built to the standard blue brick-built GWR design, located towards the opposite end of the eastbound platform. From 17 December 1973 under British Railways it was downgraded to a "fringe box" to the Panel Signal Box at Plymouth railway station, when the signal boxes at Brent and other intermediate locations were closed. The signal box was closed on 9 November 1987, when new multiple-aspect signals were brought into use, controlled from the new signalling centre at Exeter.

Now used as a café, it was one of 26 "highly distinctive" signal boxes listed by Ed Davey, minister for the Department for Culture, Media and Sport in July 2013, in a joint initiative by English Heritage and Network Rail to preserve and provide a window into how railways were operated in the past.

== Connections ==
Bus services, operated by Stagecoach South West and Country Bus, connect the station to the town centre, Newton Abbot, Plymouth and Dartmouth. These can be accessed from the car park on the south-east side.

A footpath from here leads under the viaduct at the north-east end of the station to a footbridge that crosses the River Dart alongside the railway to reach Totnes Riverside station; from here, heritage services run to Buckfastleigh.
