= Nappers Halt railway station =

Railway station in Devon, England

Nappers Halt
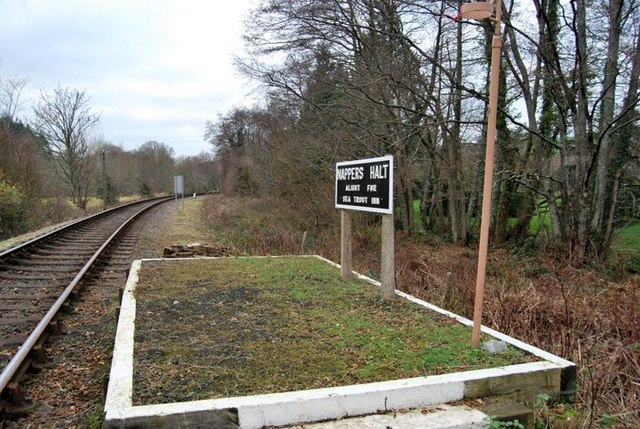

General information
- Location: Staverton, South Hams; England
- Coordinates: 50.46126°N 3.70256°W
- System: Station on heritage railway
- Operator: South Devon Railway
- Platforms: 1

Key dates
- 20 March 1999: Opened
Location

Nappers Halt railway station is situated on the South Devon Railway, a heritage railway in Devon, England. It serves the Sea Trout Inn, near Staverton.

The station was opened by the South Devon Railway Trust. Trains only stop on special event days.

Preceding station	Heritage railways	Following station
Totnes (Riverside)	South Devon Railway	Staverton
