= SDRE =

SDRE may be:

- South Devon Railway Engineering
- Sunny Day Real Estate
