= Staverton, Devon =

Village in Devon, England

Coordinates: 50.4667°N 3.7°W

Staverton
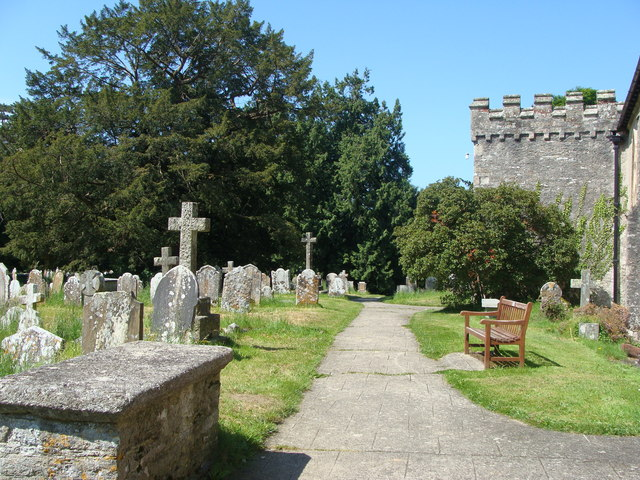
- Staverton parish churchyard

- Location within Devon
- Population: 717 (2001 Census)
- OS grid reference: SX7963
- Civil parish: Staverton
- District: South Hams
- Shire county: Devon
- Region: South West
- Country: England
- Sovereign state: United Kingdom
- Post town: TOTNES
- Postcode district: TQ9
- Dialling code: 01803
- Police: Devon and Cornwall
- Fire: Devon and Somerset
- Ambulance: South Western
- UK Parliament: Totnes

Staverton is a village and civil parish in the South Hams of Devon, England consisting of 297 households and a population of 717 (total parish).

There is one pub, The Sea Trout, which is in the centre of the village. The village also has a public phone box, multiple notice boards and two post boxes.

== Parish church ==
Staverton's Church of England parish church of St Paul de Leon is mostly early 14th century. It has a nave and north and south aisles and a thin west tower. The medieval windows have been replaced by ones of a later period. Features of interest include the rood screen (much restored), the 18th-century pulpit, and a monument to the family of Worth, 1629.

== Historic estates ==
The parish of Staverton contains various historic estates including:

- Kingston, long a seat of the Rowe family.

== Transport ==
There are two stops of the South Devon Railway Trust within the village boundary: Staverton railway station and Nappers Halt. Staverton railway station is next to Staverton Bridge, which crosses the River Dart and was probably built around 1413. It is considered to be one of the best examples of medieval bridges surviving in Devon. "Seven obtusely pointed arches; one of the oldest Devon bridges". The bishop of Exeter collected alms for the building of the bridge; those who contributed were granted an indulgence of 40 days. The bridge's name was adopted for the folk group formed in the 1970s by Sam Richards, Tish Stubbs and Paul Wilson.

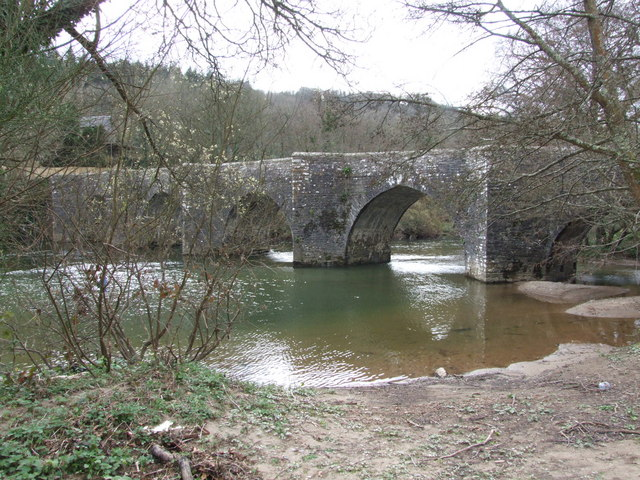
Staverton Bridge

== Village band ==
Staverton is home to a village band: The Stavertones. Consisting of nine musicians, the band plays a hip blend of funky fusion, jammin' jazz and pop. With a Facebook page liked by over 141 people, a good proportion of the population of the village, the band is a prominent fixture in village life.

== Notable people ==
- George Caunter, baptised in Staverton in 1758, was Acting Superintendent of Penang (then Prince of Wales Island), as well as holding a number of other posts in the administration of the island. The Caunter family lived at Abham, a tenement in Staverton, for several generations.
