= Buckfastleigh, Totnes and South Devon Railway =

Buckfastleigh, Ashburton and South Devon Railway
Overview
- Headquarters: Newton Abbot
- Locale: England
- Dates of operation: 1872–1897
- Successor: Great Western Railway

Technical
- Track gauge: 7 ft 1/4 in (2,140 mm)
- Length: 10.03 miles (16.14 km)

The Buckfastleigh, Totnes and South Devon Railway built the broad gauge railway line from Totnes to Buckfastleigh and Ashburton in Devon, England.

== History ==
In the first decades of the 19th century, Buckfastleigh and Ashburton were important towns in the region. Ashburton was an important stannary and woollen town, while Buckfastleigh had established woollen mills as well as other manufacturing industries. Both towns were on the coaching road from Plymouth to Exeter, and this transport link was important to their success.

When railways in the area began to be proposed, a number of alternative routes between Plymouth and Exeter were put forward, and a line through Buckfastleigh and Ashburton was considered. However, the line actually adopted was the South Devon Railway (SDR) which followed a more southerly course through Teignmouth, Newton Abbot and Totnes. This line opened in 1847, (Note: The SDR opened to Totnes in 1847; it had opened the previous year to Newton, later called Newton Abbot; and the following year from Totnes to Plymouth, Laira Green.) and Buckfastleigh and Ashburton were not close to the new railway. They quickly found that other towns that were railway-connected gained in importance as their transport costs were reduced, and Buckfastleigh and Ashburton declined rapidly due to the competitive disadvantage.

It was clear to local people that the impact on the towns would be seriously negative, as the coach traffic would cease, and Buckfastleigh and Ashburton would be off the contemporary transport network. It appears that Totnes was concerned too, for on 14 June 1845 a public meeting there resolved that "it is most essential to the interest and welfare of this town to be connected by railway with the towns of Buckfastleigh and Ashburton as leading to develop the resources of this important town and agricultural district."

The enthusiasm to vote for the motion seems not to have been carried into urgent action, but on 27 July 1846 the Ashburton, Newton and South Devon Railway Act 1846 (9 & 10 Vict. c. ccxxxviii) authorised the Ashburton, Newton and South Devon Junction Railway from Ashburton to Newton with capital was £130,000, and the engineer was Isambard Kingdom Brunel. At this time getting money was extremely difficult, and it proved impossible to raise the required capital; in 1851 the company was dissolved, with nothing done.

== A viable scheme ==
Buckfastleigh, Totnes and South Devon Railway Act 1864
- Act of Parliament
- Parliament of the United Kingdom
- Long title: An Act for incorporating a Company for making a Railway in the County of Devon, to be called "The Buckfastleigh, Totnes, and South Devon Railway;" and for other Purposes.
- Citation: 27 & 28 Vict. c. cclviii

Dates
- Royal assent: 25 July 1864

Text of statute as originally enacted

Decline had been predicted for the industries of Buckfastleigh and Ashburton if they were isolated from the railway network, and the gloomy forecast proved true. In 1863 interested men of affairs promoted a new railway, this time to connect to the South Devon Railway (SDR) at Totnes, and to extend to the quayside on the River Dart. In due course on 25 July 1864 (Note: According to Carter; Kingdom and Awdry say 25 June 1864.) the Buckfastleigh, Totnes and South Devon Railway Company obtained an authorising act of Parliament, the Buckfastleigh, Totnes and South Devon Railway Act 1864 (27 & 28 Vict. c. cclviii).

The main line was to be not quite ten miles (16 km) long. The short branch, a "railway or tramway", to the Quays at Totnes was on the south side of the SDR main line, and was to be horse-worked. The use of locomotives, stationary engines and ropes, or "atmospheric agency" (i.e. the now discredited atmospheric traction system), were all forbidden. The line was to be on the broad gauge.

Buckfastleigh, Totnes and South Devon Railway Act 1865
- Act of Parliament
- Parliament of the United Kingdom
- Long title: An Act for enabling the Buckfastleigh, Totnes, and South Devon Railway Company to extend their Railway to Ashburton; and for other Purposes.
- Citation: 28 & 29 Vict. c. xli

Dates
- Royal assent: 26 May 1865

Raising the money was a little easier now than in 1848, but Ashburton's omission from the scheme cut off a large section of potential financial support, and the following year a further act of Parliament, the Buckfastleigh, Totnes and South Devon Railway Act 1865 (28 & 29 Vict. c. xli), was obtained, on 26 May 1865, authorising an extension of the line to Ashburton; however the town remained absent from the company name.

== Construction and opening ==
Construction of the line was exceedingly slow due to difficulty in raising money. Although some work had been done in 1867, in 1868 it was reported that work was at a standstill, and that parliamentary authority of an extension of time needed to be applied for.

Buckfastleigh, Totnes and South Devon Railway Act 1869
- Act of Parliament
- Parliament of the United Kingdom
- Long title: An Act for conferring further power on the Buckfastleigh, Totnes, and South Devon Railway Company with reference to their authorized capital.
- Citation: 32 & 33 Vict. c. lxxv

Dates
- Royal assent: 12 July 1869

Text of statute as originally enacted

Authority was obtained in the Buckfastleigh, Totnes and South Devon Railway Act 1869 (32 & 33 Vict. c. lxxv) to raise some money by the issue of 5% preference shares, (Note: Subscribers were guaranteed their 5% if the company made enough net profit to pay that, and this dividend took precedence over the dividend for ordinary shares.) and certain debenture loans.

== Opening—of the main line ==
At length the construction of the line was completed, and amid much rejoicing and festivity the line from Ashburton to the South Devon Railway's Totnes station opened for passenger and goods traffic on 1 May 1872; it was worked from the outset by the South Devon Railway. The traditional industries of the district in general had further declined, but the woollen mills of Buckfastleigh had resisted the trend, and they provided much of the goods traffic on the line: manufactured articles outwards and coal for the plant inwards. Passenger traffic on the line was significant, but not dominant.

The first half-year accounts (to 31 March 1873) showed gross receipts of £1,893 10s 0d, and net profit of £1,055 12s 7d after deduction of the SDR charges for working the line. 45,336 passenger journeys had been made, and over 12,000 tons of goods had been carried.

== The Quay line ==
The construction of the tramway to the Quays had not been carried out with the main line, but by October 1873 it was reported that it was completed, but could not be opened because of required alterations to the signalling on the SDR at the junction with that company's main line at Totnes. However, this was soon rectified and the Quay line opened 10 November 1873; it was for goods traffic only, and was horse-operated. (Note: Except for a stub at the main line end, where locomotives were permitted after 24 August 1874.)

== An appeal against SDR charges ==
At the October 1873 shareholders' meeting the directors reported that the charges from the South Devon Railway (SDR) for operating the line were higher than expected and were not in accordance with the agreement for working the line. £1,055 operating profit in a half-year was small on capital of £130,000 when debenture interest was to be paid first, and it would "leave nothing for Dividend". At the May 1874 meeting, the directors congratulated the shareholders on a successful outcome of the dispute; however the full year (1873) accounts now showed £4,147 12s 10d gross profit, £2,127 4s 0d net. The first half-year SDR charge before the dispute, and doubled to equate to a full year, were £1,676 (44%), and the actual post-dispute charge was £2,020 (49%).

It is difficult to follow how this was an improvement; however the directors, on this and subsequent occasions, urged consignors to specify Totnes Quay as a destination in preference to Totnes SDR station, where terminal charges would be levied against the smaller company.

== The Great Western Railway ==
The South Devon Railway Company was working the Buckfastleigh line. On 1 February 1876 the SDR amalgamated with the Great Western Railway (GWR) and the Bristol and Exeter Railway (B&ER); the combined company was named the Great Western Railway. The GWR now assumed the role of working the Buckfastleigh line.

== Change of gauge ==
The line had been built on the 7 ft 1/4 in (2,140 mm) broad gauge, which was the track gauge of the SDR to which it connected at Totnes. In 1892 the Great Western Railway, as successor to the SDR, altered the gauge of its lines in Devon and Cornwall to 4 ft 8 1/2 in (1,435 mm) standard gauge. (Note: The South Devon Railway had obtained Parliamentary authority to do so, including the track of the Buckfastleigh company, in 1875.) The work was actually carried out over the weekend 20–23 May 1892, from which time the Buckfastleigh line was a standard gauge line.

== Financial difficulties ==
The company had never been in good financial health, and the situation seems to have deteriorated after the initial years. By 1896 it was obvious that the company could not continue, and a liquidator was appointed pending sale. The GWR was the only possible purchaser; the sale was approved by the Great Western Railway (Additional Powers) Act 1897 (60 & 61 Vict. c. ccxlviii), and the sale took effect on 1 July 1897. (Note: Kingdom refers to this as an amalgamation, but it was clearly a forced sale.) The shareholders received £22,450 for their £130,000 investment. The GWR assumed the obligations of the debentures and preference share guarantees.

== Under the GWR ==
The line had been saved by the GWR and indeed some improvement to it passenger carryings took place in the years up to the beginning of World War I. The GWR introduced its railmotor services for passenger trains on the branch, and later push and pull trains (often called auto-trains), in both cases reducing operating costs somewhat.

However Newton Abbot became increasingly the commercial centre in the locality, and Totnes lost importance. As road transport—for passengers as well as goods—became available the short road journey to Newton Abbot was decisive for most purposes and the line's traffic declined. The small-scale traditional industries of Buckfastleigh and Ashburton were now obsolescent and their potential railway traffic declined with them. Passenger tickets issued at Ashburton declined from 24,688 in 1903 to 13,851 in 1923 and 4,843 in 1933.

== Nationalisation—and closure ==
The Transport Act 1947 brought most of the railways of Great Britain into national ownership under British Railways. This had little impact on the operational circumstances of the line, but the decline in usage became increasingly obvious. The decision was taken to close the line to passengers, and the last ordinary passenger train ran on 3 November 1958. Goods traffic on the line continued until Friday 7 September 1962. The following day the final revenue train ran, an enthusiasts' special passenger train. The main line was now closed.

However the Quay line served numerous industrial premises and remained in occasional use; it closed for general goods on 14 June 1965, and the service to the private sidings finished after 4 December 1967.

== Reopening ==
It was re-opened as the "Dart Valley Railway", a heritage railway, on 5 April 1969, the opening ceremony being performed by Dr Richard Beeching. (Note: Beeching had become notorious in railway circles for the Beeching cuts, in which many passenger routes in Great Britain were closed; however the Ashburton line closed several years before Beeching entered the railway industry.) In 1971 the line beyond Buckfastleigh was again closed and the A38 road was built on the route of the railway. The South Devon Railway Trust took over the running of the line on 1 January 1991.

== Stations ==
- Ashburton; the terminus had an all-over train shed, covering the passenger platform and the run-round road, which in the twentieth century had a platform face for goods and cattle. Ashburton had an engine shed and a turntable until 1900.
- Buckfastleigh
- Staverton
- Totnes; branch trains used the main line platforms, no bay platform ever having been constructed.

Since the line re-opened as a heritage railway, a new Totnes (Riverside) railway station has been opened to avoid the need for trains to run into the Network Rail station. A footbridge over the river links the two stations. Staverton station was named Staverton Bridge when it reopened in April 1969, but the suffix "fell into disuse" in the 1980s.

== Operations ==
Passenger trains arriving from Ashburton used the down platform at Totnes, and departing passenger trains to Ashburton used the up platform. In post-war operation, the first auto-train from Totnes to Ashburton started from the Down platform at Totnes, but could not convey passengers as there was no locking on the crossover from that platform.

The 1954 Service Timetable shows eight daily return passenger trips, and a goods train each way.

Buckfastleigh had a crossing loop, but the loop line was for goods trains only and was not a running line. Staverton was an intermediate block post but not a staff station.

== Gradients ==
The line climbed steadily from Totnes to Ashburton, with gentle gradients as far as Staverton, then stiffening to 1 in 264 and 1 in 118; after Buckfastleigh the gradients become considerable, at 1 in 62 typically.
