= Gerald Hine-Haycock =

British broadcaster (1951–2023)

- Born: Gerald William Vaughan Hine-Haycock; 13 January 1951; London, England
- Died: 29 June 2023 (aged 72)
- Education: Wellington College, Berkshire (independent boarding school); University of Stirling; Macalester College, Minnesota
- Occupations: Journalist, correspondent, presenter
- Employer(s): ITN, BBC News, Westward Television, HTV West, BBC West
- Known for: Fmr. ITN Correspondent; Fmr. BBC News Correspondent; Fmr. HTV West and BBC West television presenter Journalist and presenter

Gerald William Vaughan Hine-Haycock (13 January 1951 – 29 June 2023), known in his earlier broadcasting career as Gerald Haycock, was a British broadcaster and journalist. He was a correspondent for Independent Television News and BBC News, and worked for former ITV regional broadcasters Westward Television and HTV West, and for BBC West (all in South West England), latterly as a programme presenter. He later became Director of the BBC Regional News Training Scheme, Course Director of the BBC's Journalist Training Scheme and Head of the BBC's SON&R Centre. From March 2020 to March 2021 he was the High Sheriff of Devon.

== Early life and education ==
Gerald William Vaughan Hine-Haycock was born in London on 13 January 1951. He is the son of Brigadier William Hine-Haycock of the Duke of Cornwall's Light Infantry and Felicity Hine-Haycock (née Harrison) of Toorak, a suburb of Melbourne, Australia, and has two sisters, Rozanthe and Daphne.

Hine-Haycock was educated at Wellington College, a boarding independent school for boys (now co-educational) in the village of Crowthorne in Berkshire in South East England, followed by the University of Stirling in the city of Stirling in Central Scotland, where he graduated with BA Honours, and Macalester College, a private liberal arts college in Saint Paul, the capital city of Minnesota, in the United States, where he studied English in 1972–73.

== Life and career ==
Hine-Haycock started in radio as a BBC graduate news trainee. He worked at BBC News, later becoming a reporter on Westward Diary for the-then ITV regional broadcasting contractor for South West England, Westward Television, followed by Independent Television News. In 1981, he joined the regional ITV company HTV West, followed by BBC West, where he presented BBC Points West (between 1991 and 2000 known as BBC News West), a regional BBC news programme. He then became BBC West's Staff Reporter, responsible for many national news stories across the BBC's output at home and abroad. He later became Director of the BBC Regional News Training Scheme, Course Director of the BBC's Journalist Training Scheme and Head of the BBC's SON&R (Sharing Opportunities across Nations & Regions) Centre, based in Bristol.

Hine-Haycock was selected as High Sheriff of Devon for the year 2020–2021.

== Personal life and death ==
Hine-Haycock had a wife, Judy, and four children. They lived at Hempstone Park in the village of Littlehempston (near the market town of Totnes) in Devon, in South West England, and provide bed-and-breakfast accommodation.

Gerald Hine-Haycock died on 29 June 2023, at the age of 72.
