= Littlehempston =

Village in Devon, England

Coordinates: 50.452°N 3.674°W

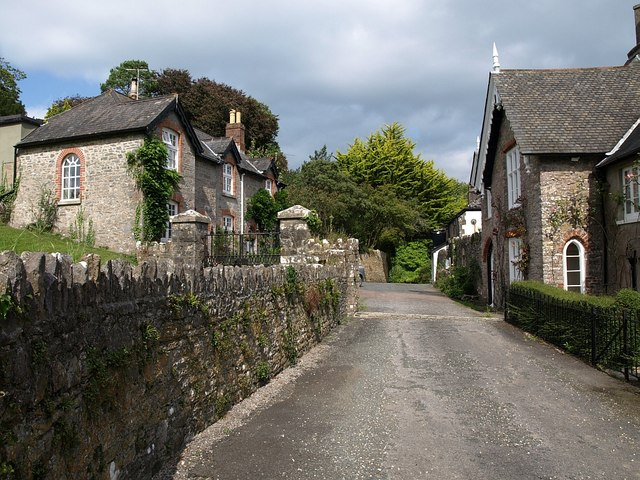
- Littlehempston

- Location within Devon
- Population: 207 (2001)
- OS grid reference: SX8162
- Civil parish: Littlehempston
- District: South Hams
- Shire county: Devon
- Region: South West
- Country: England
- Sovereign state: United Kingdom
- Post town: TOTNES
- Postcode district: TQ9
- Dialling code: 01803
- Police: Devon and Cornwall
- Fire: Devon and Somerset
- Ambulance: South Western
- UK Parliament: South Devon

Littlehempston is a village and civil parish in the South Hams district of Devon, England consisting of 83 households, with a population of 207 in the parish. It has also been called Little Hempston and Hempston Arundel.

The village has many old fashioned cottages and buildings. Its church is on the hill within the village and is near to where a footpath begins, taking walkers through two miles of fields and woodland to Totnes.

The village has two public houses. The Tally Ho is in the centre of the village, just below the church; and The Pig & Whistle is on the A381 road to Totnes.

There is also a public phone box and noticeboard, located next to the post box just in front of a brook which eventually leads to the River Dart.

== Notable people ==
- William Vallance Whiteway, QC KCMG (1 April 1828 – 24 June 1908), politician and three time Premier of Newfoundland, was born at Buckyette in the parish.
- Gerald Hine-Haycock, former ITN and BBC News Correspondent; HTV West and BBC West programme presenter, lived in the village.
- Keith Law, Songwriter for Velvett Fogg, lived in the village.

== See also ==
- Totnes (Riverside) railway station
