= Percy Emerson Culverhouse =

- Born: 20 August 1871
- Died: 7 May 1953 (aged 81)
- Occupation: Railway architect
- Years active: 1929–1945
- Employer: Great Western Railway
- Spouse: Madeline Anina Ella Walker

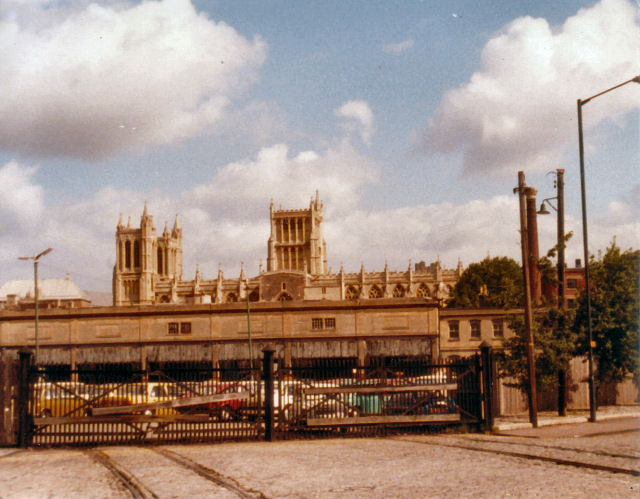
Canon's Marsh goods shed

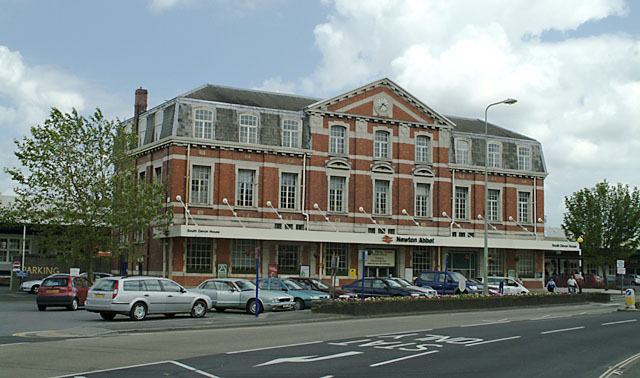
Newton Abbot railway station of 1927

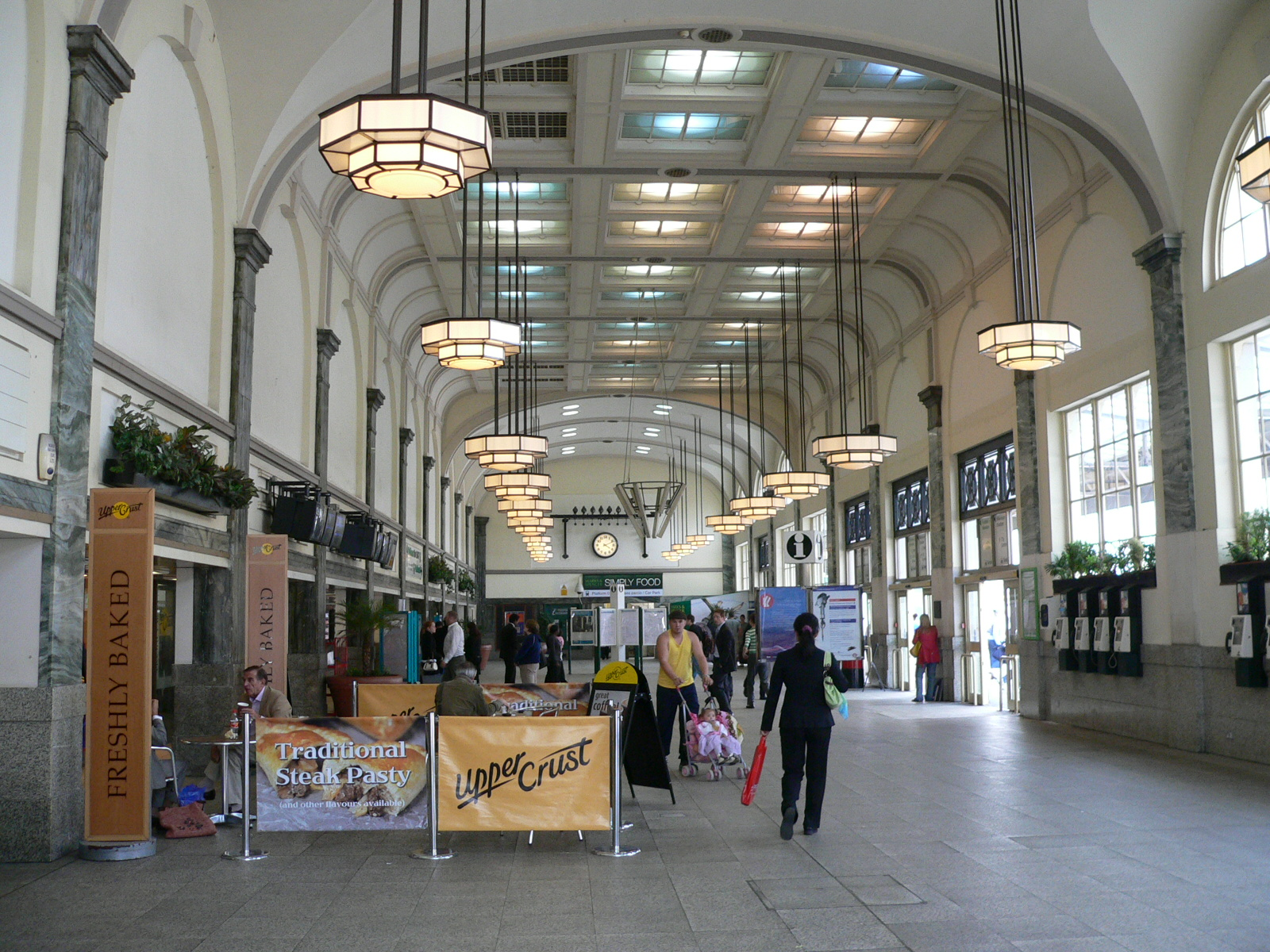
The concourse of Cardiff Central railway station of 1923–35

Percy Emerson Culverhouse (20 August 1871 – 7 May 1953) was a British railway architect who was Chief Architect of the Great Western Railway from 1929 to 1945.

== Career ==
He was born on 20 August 1871 to Eli Culverhouse (1828–1911) and Jane Mary Jones (1840–1919).

At age 21 he was registered as a clerk at Paddington Station, working for the Great Western Railway. He progressed to Architectural Assistant to the New Works Engineer and in April 1929 was appointed Chief Architect to the Great Western Railway. He retired in September 1945 and was succeeded by Brian Lewis.

He married Madeline Anina Ella Walker on 3 April 1902.

He died on 7 May 1953 in Ealing, Middlesex leaving an estate of £8013 15s 6d (equivalent to £186,000 in 2023).

== Works ==
- Bath railway station 1896 refreshment rooms alterations
- Banbury railway station 1904 refreshment rooms alterations
- Canon's Marsh Goods Sheed, Anchor Road, Bristol 1906
- Hammersmith railway station 1909
- Newton Abbot railway station 1927
- Bristol Temple Meads railway station. Additional platforms and cream terracotta buildings. 1930–35
- Paddington railway station Eastbourne Terrace Elevation, 18 bays of offices 1930–36
- Great Western Royal Hotel, Paddington 1930s extensions.
- Cardiff Central railway station 1932–35
- Bourton-on-the-Water railway station 1936
- Leamington Spa railway station 1939
