= Totnes (Riverside) railway station =

Heritage railway station in Devon, England

Totnes Riverside
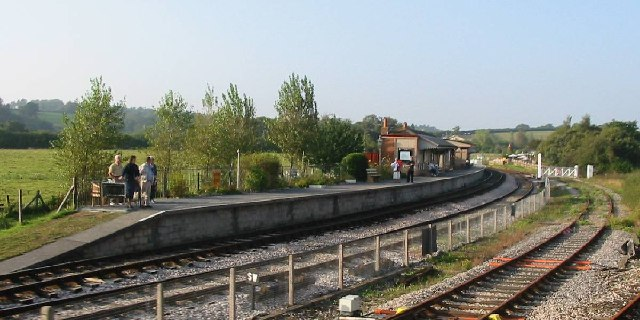

General information
- Location: Littlehempston, South Hams; England
- Coordinates: 50.43977°N 3.68580°W
- System: Station on heritage railway
- Operator: South Devon Railway
- Platforms: 1

History
- Original company: Dart Valley Railway

Key dates
- 1977: Riverside loop opened
- 1993: Access to the station opened
- 2016: Signal box commissioned
Location

Totnes (Riverside) railway station, previously known as Totnes Littlehempston railway station and Littlehempston Riverside railway station, is a railway station situated in Littlehempston in the English county of Devon. It is the southern terminus of the South Devon Railway, a steam-operated heritage railway. The station should not be confused with the Totnes main line station on the National Rail Exeter to Plymouth line, which is a 330-yard (300 m) walk away.

== Description ==
Totnes (Riverside) station is located on the east bank of the River Dart, adjacent to the main line railway. Although less than one mile (1.6 km) from the centre of the town of Totnes, the surroundings are rural. A footpath and footbridge over the river form the only non-rail land access to the station, although a small jetty allows a water taxi to link the station with the centre of the town at some states of the tide.

The station has a single main platform, with a locomotive run round loop and a bay platform. The station building accommodates a booking office, whilst a rail van in the bay platform contains a small exhibition. A rail connection permits special trains to run directly between the South Devon line and the main line railway station. At the Buckfastleigh end of the station is a signal box and a level crossing, which provides the only access to the adjacent Totnes Rare Breeds Farm.

== History ==
Prior to its preservation as a heritage railway, what is now the South Devon Railway was originally a branch line connecting Totnes to Buckfastleigh and Ashburton. Branch line trains joined the main line at Ashburton Junction adjacent to the current site of Riverside station, crossed the railway bridge over the River Dart and terminated in the main line railway station.

When the line was first re-opened as a heritage line in 1969, the owners were unable to reach an agreement with British Rail for their trains to run into the main line railway station. Initially push-pull trains were used, controlled from an autocoach at one or both ends, and reversing just short of the junction.

However eventually land adjacent to the junction was acquired, and a loop constructed in 1977; a platform was added a few years later but there was no public route between the station and Totnes. At this time it appeared in the timetable as "Totnes Riverside". Visitors to the railway arriving by main line train had to catch a bus from Totnes to Buckfastleigh from where they could ride the train to Totnes and back, then return to Totnes by bus.

To avoid confusion to passengers expecting to be able to board heritage trains at Totnes, the station was renamed "Littlehempston Riverside" in the 1980s. A redundant building from Toller on the closed Bridport branch was re-erected at Littlehempston in 1986 to serve as a ticket office.

British Rail allowed heritage line trains into the main line station in 1985, and for three years regular services were run into that station. However the charges levied for use of the station proved not to be cost effective and so the trains eventually returned to using Littlehempston in 1988. In 1993 a new footbridge was built alongside the existing railway bridge, thus providing public access to the station from the town of Totnes and the main line railway station. With this the station was renamed again to "Totnes (Littlehempston)", but in 2017 this was changed again to "Totnes (Riverside)".

== Services ==
The station is served by trains on all operating days of the South Devon Railway. Trains operate daily from late March to the end of October. On most days a single train set operates, providing four journeys a day in each direction. On busy days two train sets may operate, providing more journeys.

Preceding station	Heritage railways	Following station
Terminus	South Devon Railway	Staverton
	National Rail	
Interchange with Totnes on the National Rail network
