= Staverton railway station =

Heritage railway station in Devon, England

Staverton
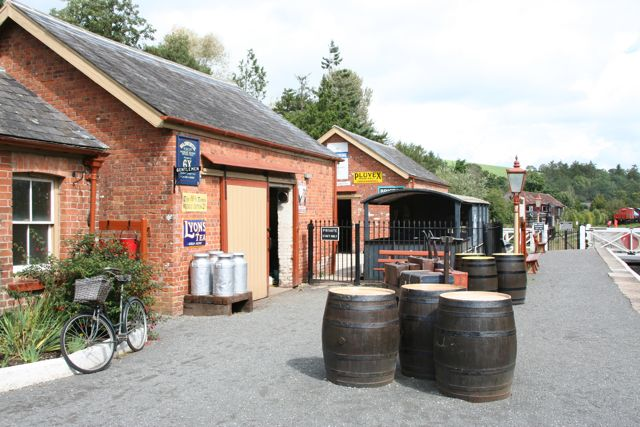

General information
- Location: Staverton, South Hams; England
- Coordinates: 50.46100°N 3.7149°W
- Grid reference: SX783637
- System: Station on heritage railway
- Operator: South Devon Railway
- Platforms: 1

History
- Original company: Buckfastleigh, Totnes and South Devon Railway
- Pre-grouping: Great Western Railway
- Post-grouping: Great Western Railway

Key dates
- 1872: Opened
- 1958: Closed to passengers
- 1969: Reopened
Location

Staverton railway station is situated on the South Devon Railway, a heritage railway in Devon, England. It serves the village of Staverton.

== History ==
The station was opened by the Buckfastleigh, Totnes and South Devon Railway on 1 May 1872. The railway was amalgamated into the Great Western Railway in 1897 and this in turn was nationalised into British Railways on 1 January 1948.

The station closed to passengers on 3 November 1958 although goods traffic continued until 10 September 1962. It was re-opened by the Dart Valley Railway, a heritage railway, on 5 April 1969. The South Devon Railway Trust took over the running of the line on 1 January 1991.

== Description ==
There is a single platform on the north side of the line. There is a small brick building which houses the ticket office and two former goods sheds. There is a level crossing at the Totnes end of the station and a small signal box opposite the platform.

== Services ==
The station is served by trains on all operating days of the South Devon Railway. Trains operate daily from late March to the end of October. On most days, a single train set operates, providing four journeys a day in each direction. On busy days, two train sets may operate, providing more journeys.

Preceding station	Heritage railways	Following station
Totnes (Riverside)	South Devon Railway	Buckfastleigh
