= Ashburton railway station =

Disused railway station in Devon, England

Coordinates: 50°30′51.3″N 3°45′15.7″W

Ashburton
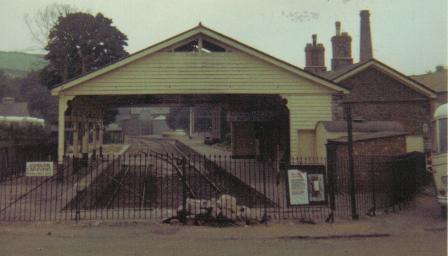
- Ashburton in 1969

General information
- Location: Ashburton, Teignbridge; England
- Platforms: 1

Other information
- Status: Disused

History
- Original company: Buckfastleigh, Totnes and South Devon Railway
- Pre-grouping: Great Western Railway
- Post-grouping: Great Western Railway

Key dates
- 1872: Station opened
- 1958: Closed to passenger trains
- 1962: Closed to all trains
- 1969: Reopened by Dart Valley Railway
- 1971: Station finally closed
Location

Ashburton railway station is a closed railway station situated in the town of Ashburton in Devon, England. It was the terminus of a branch line from Totnes.

== History ==
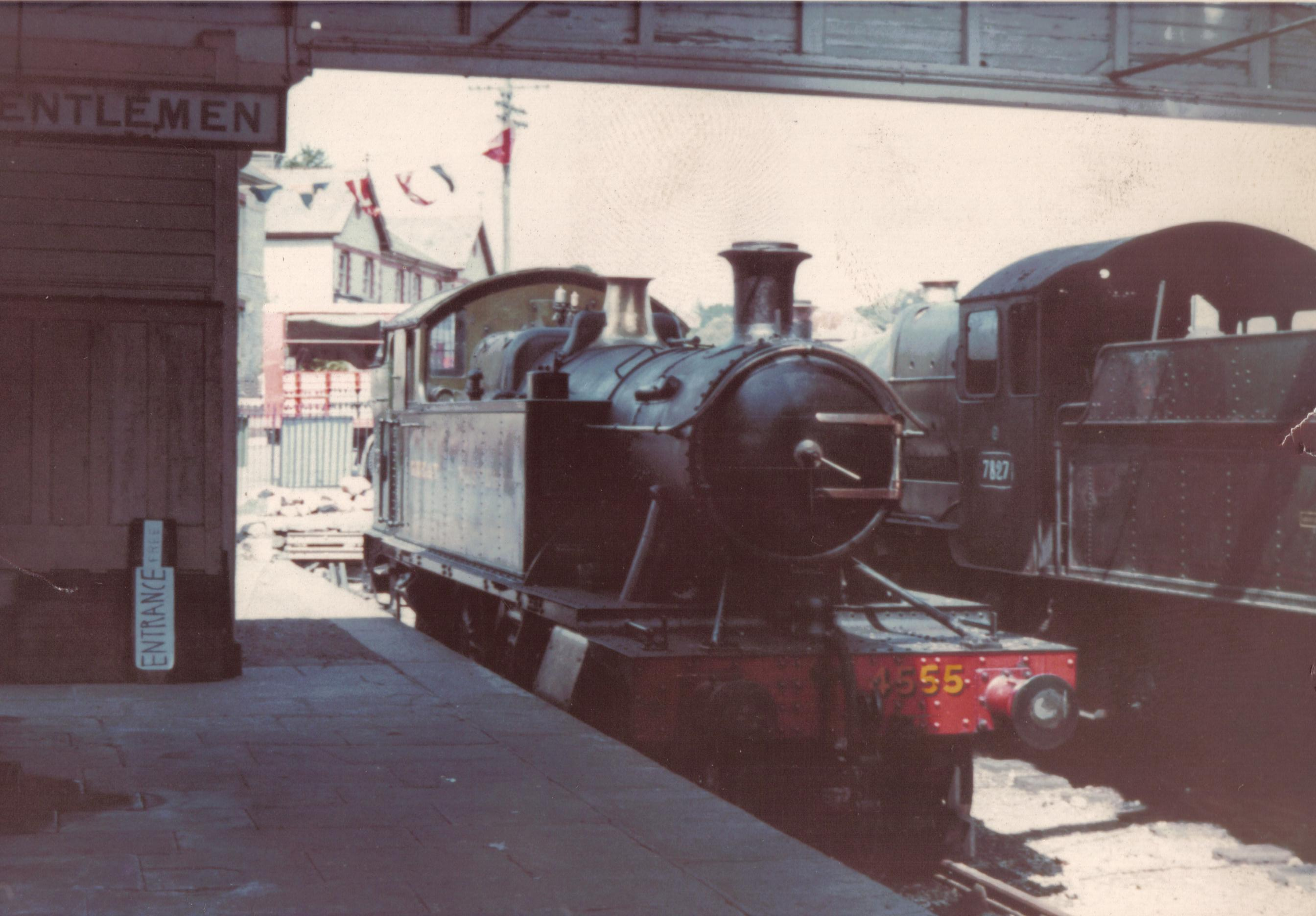
The station as the terminus of the Dart Valley Railway in 1969.

Ashburton station, along with the rest of the branch from Totnes, was opened by the Buckfastleigh, Totnes and South Devon Railway on 1 May 1872. The railway was amalgamated into the Great Western Railway in 1897 and this in turn was nationalised into British Railways on 1 January 1948. The station closed to passengers in November 1958 although goods traffic on the line continued until 7 September 1962.

The station was briefly re-opened by the Dart Valley Railway, a heritage railway, on 5 April 1969 following which occasional works trains operated but the station was closed finally in 1971 when the track bed between Ashburton and Buckfastleigh was needed for improvements to the A38 road. The South Devon Railway, a successor to the Dart Valley Railway, still operates the remainder of the branch between Totnes and Buckfastleigh.

== The site today ==
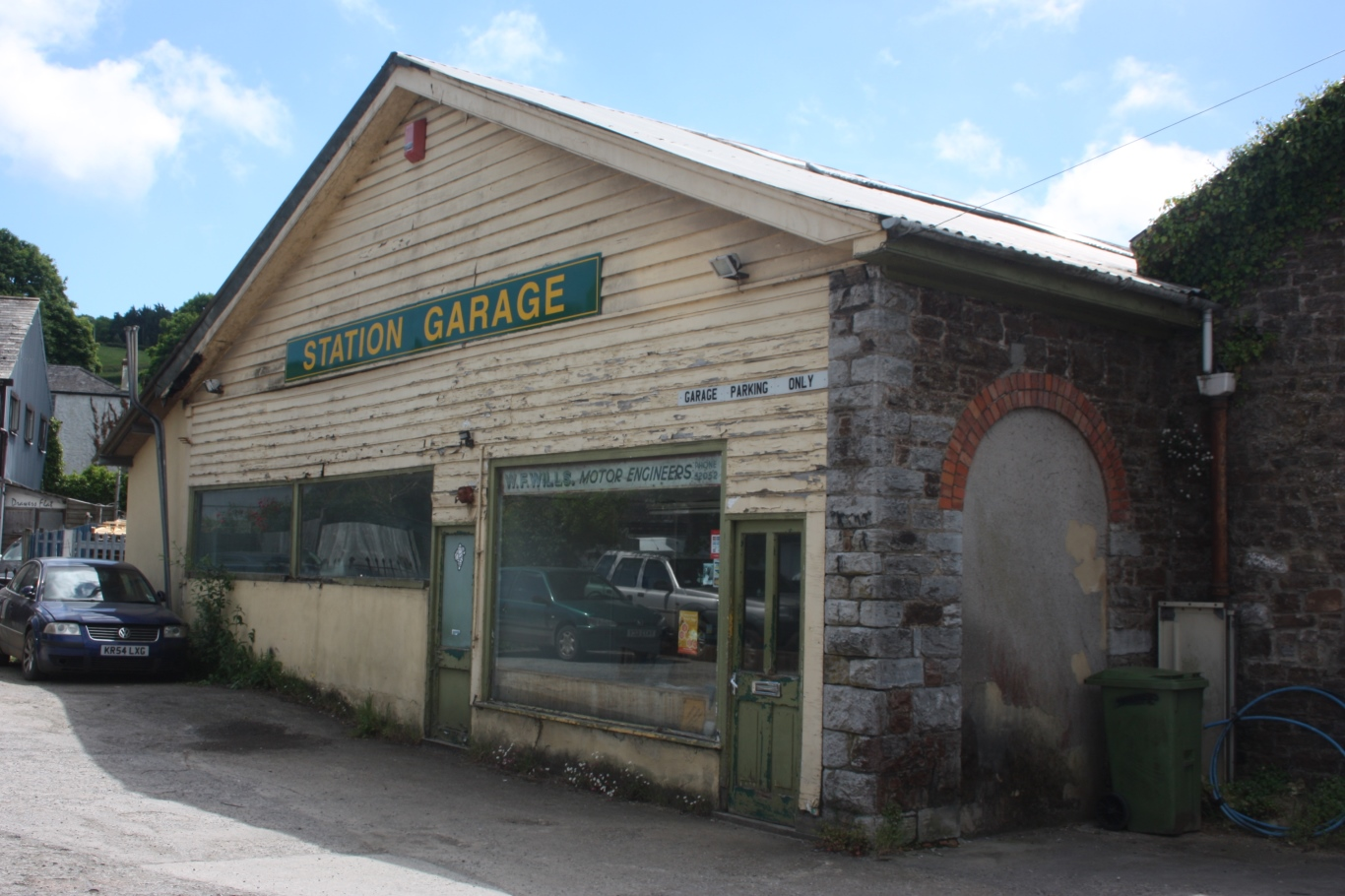
The station used as a garage

The station buildings with the important overall roof and the nearby goods shed both still stand as reminders of the town's railway past.

In 2014/15, the planners within the Dartmoor National Park Authority (DPNA) working with Teignbridge District Council (TDC - the managing local government authority), recommended that the residual trackbed within the town, together with the area surrounding the station - a total of 3.5 hectares (8.6 acres) - be designated for redevelopment under the Chuley Road Masterplan. In their final Masterplan, issued in 2015, the former trackbed up to and including land close to the former station site were proposed to be used for developing housing, a supermarket and light industrial units. The "Friends of Ashburton Station" (FoAS), backed by the South Devon Railway Trust (SDRT), successfully legally challenged the Masterplan, with the courts decreeing that the plan had to return to draft status, as it had not been fully consulted on by local residents. FoAS and the SDRT are now working on a £20M proposal to eventually return heritage railway services to the unique station, whilst in the short term using the site for local arts, educational and training initiatives. Following further investigations, DNPA and TDC have presently formally withdrawn the Masterplan, although they presently will consider individual planning applications within the designated Chuley Road site, on their individual basis and within the existing local planning map of TDC.

Preceding station	Disused railways	Following station
Buckfastleigh	Great Western Railway; Ashburton branch railway	Terminus
