= South Devon Railway (heritage railway) =

Heritage railway in Devon, England

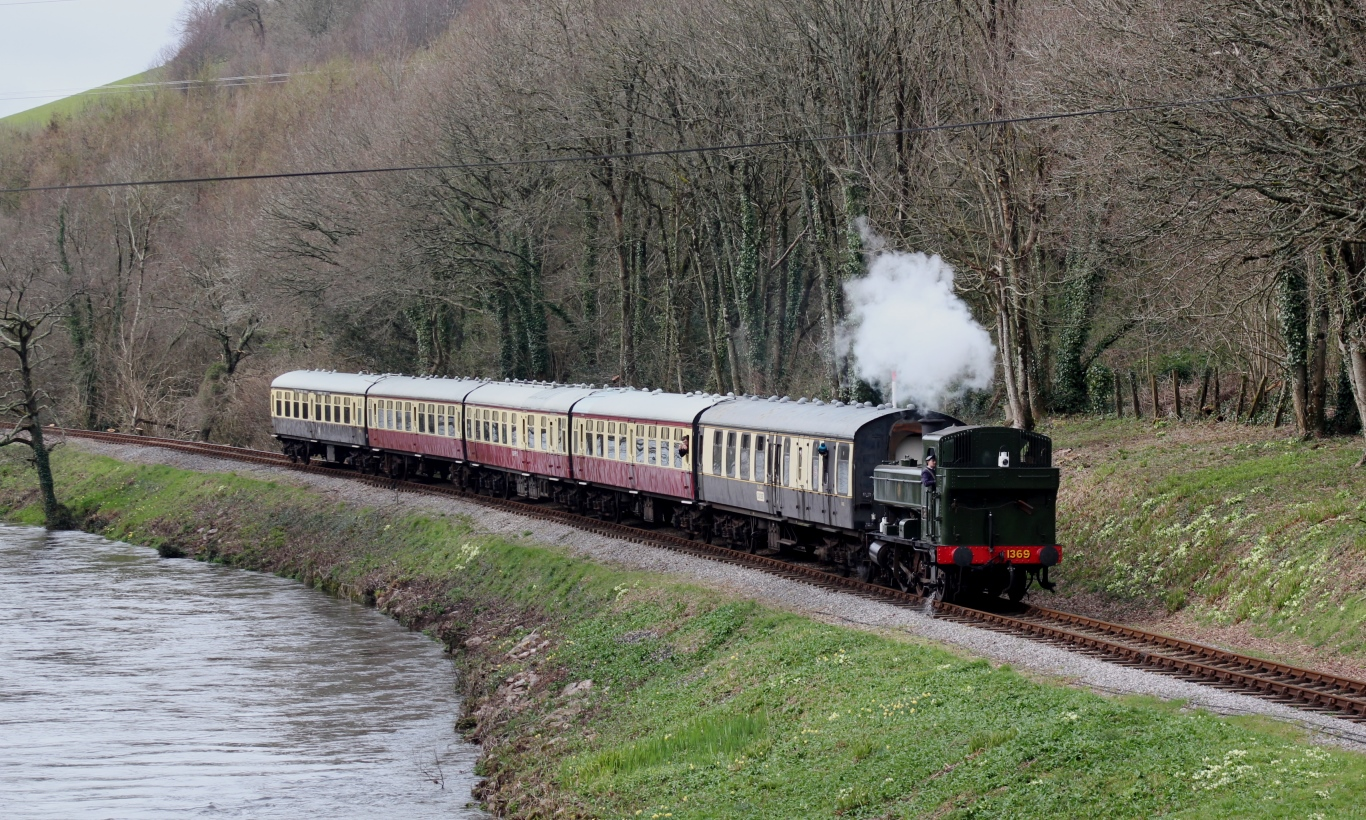
- GWR pannier tank 1369 beside the River Dart near Staverton
- Terminus: Buckfastleigh; 50.4824°N 3.7685°W; Totnes; 50.4400°N 3.6858°W

Commercial operations
- Name: British Rail
- Built by: Buckfastleigh, Totnes and South Devon Railway
- Original gauge: 7 ft 1/4 in (2,140 mm) Brunel gauge

Preserved operations
- Operated by: South Devon Railway Trust
- Stations: 4
- Length: 6.64 miles (10.7 km)
- Preserved gauge: 4 ft 8 1/2 in (1,435 mm) standard gauge

Commercial history
- Opened: 1872
- 1892: Gauge conversion to 4 ft 8 1/2 in (1,435 mm) standard gauge
- Closed: 1962

Preservation history
- 1969: Re-opened as Dart Valley Railway
- 1991: Became the South Devon Railway
- Headquarters: Buckfastleigh

The South Devon Railway (SDR) is a 6.64-mile (10.69 km) heritage railway from Totnes to Buckfastleigh in Devon. Mostly running alongside the River Dart, it was initially known as the Dart Valley Railway. The railway is now operated by the South Devon Railway Trust, a registered charity.

The railway's headquarters and museum are located at Buckfastleigh railway station.

== History ==
A 10 1/2-mile (16.9 km) railway between Newton Abbot and Ashburton was authorised by the Ashburton, Newton and South Devon Railway Act 1846 (9 & 10 Vict. c. ccxxxviii). However, with the economy in recession the scheme failed to find sufficient backing. After the construction of the South Devon Railway Company (SDR) from Exeter to Plymouth that had been approved by the South Devon Railway Act 1844 (7 & 8 Vict. c. lxviii), a new Buckfastleigh, Totnes and South Devon Railway scheme was proposed to make a junction with the SDR at Totnes and link it with Buckfastleigh, running alongside the River Dart. It was authorised by the Buckfastleigh, Totnes and South Devon Railway Act 1864 (27 & 28 Vict. c. cclviii) and opened as a broad gauge line through to Ashburton on 1 May 1872 and was operated from the outset by the SDR (which became part of the Great Western Railway in 1876). The last passenger train ran on 3 November 1958 although freight traffic continued until 7 September 1962.

=== Preservation ===
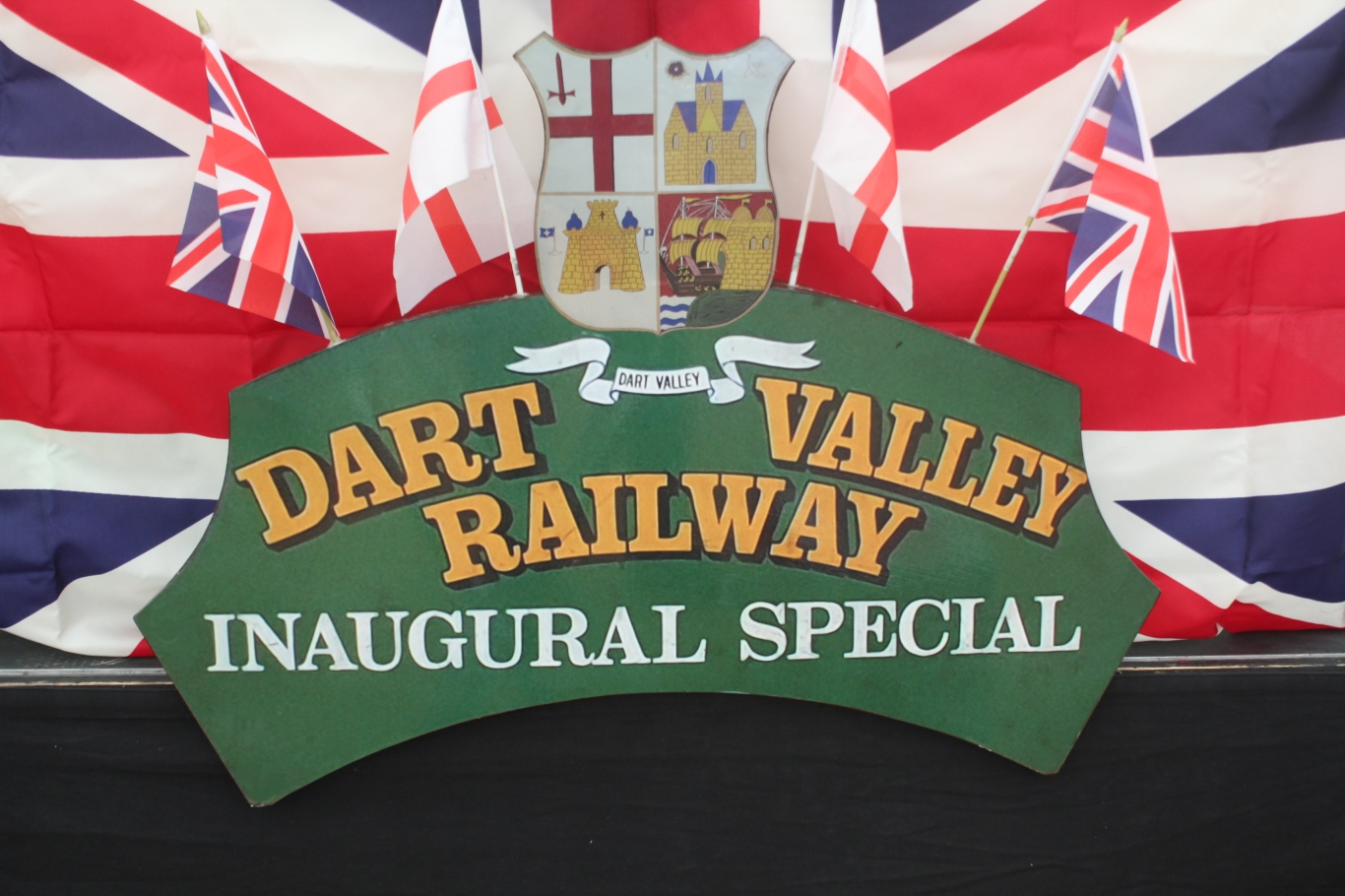
The headboard from the inaugural train in 1969

Having secured GWR 4500 Class Small Prairie Tank No.4555 for £750 from BR, Patrick Whitehouse and fellow "Birmingham Railway Mafia" member Pat Garland were looking to secure a GWR style branch line on which to run the locomotive. Both had been involved in the world's first ever heritage railway at the Talyllyn Railway, and so were seeking a complete and in-place railway. In partnership with fellow Talyllyn veteran Bill Faulkner and other local businessman, having originally focused on the already closed GWR Kingsbridge branch. With the track already being removed there, they then focused on the Buckfastleigh to Ashburton branch. Their business plan was to launch and operate a profitable summer-season tourist railway, focused on the many summer visitors who choose to holiday in South Devon.

Forming the Dart Valley Light Railway Company Ltd, it took ownership of the branch line in October 1965, and was granted a light railway order to operate in 1966. However, the Ministry for Transport insisted that the railway assist in improvements to the A38 road, and it was not until 1969 that an agreement was made to operate from Totnes to Buckfastleigh, with the section beyond to Ashburton lost to dual carriageway improvements to the A38 trunk road. The final severing of the line took place in 1971. The rare Brunel-style station building at Ashburton, with its overhead roof, survives as a garage.

The first passenger train ran on 5 April 1969, with Dr Richard Beeching performing the official opening ceremony on 21 May 1969. Operated from the outset – as had the Talyllyn and the Ffestiniog Railway – as a commercial railway, in the first year the Dart Valley carried 60,000 passengers at a profit.

In 1971, the company was offered the opportunity to purchase from British Rail the freehold of the Kingswear Branch, running from Paignton to Kingswear, and hence by ferry to Dartmouth. To complete the purchase, in 1972 the original preservation company became the "Dart Valley Railway Company plc" (DVR), although it was not listed on the London Stock Exchange.

As of 1979, work to build a permanent terminus at Totnes Riverside was proceeding, including relaying track and constructing a platform. Part of the work also involved building a footbridge to link the station with the mainline station and town centre. At Staverton, a signalling system was being planned to bring into regular use the loop at the station. At Buckfastleigh, the layout was being expanded to allow for more storage of rolling stock on site, and the workshop was under construction (the railway at this point had bought machines including a wheel lathe and gantry crane to allow for more major repairs and overhauls to be undertaken on site. The footbridge from Keynsham station was delivered to link the station to the car park and miniature railway.

=== South Devon Railway Trust ===
In 1989, the DVR plc publicly announced that the Totnes to Buckfastleigh line was uneconomic, and had hence decided to find another operator or close it. In response, the volunteers who assisted in running the line proposed to take over operations. As the articles of association of the resident GWR 4900 Class No. 4920 Dumbleton Hall charity allowed it to operate a railway, the joint-team proposed using that charity as its commercial vehicle to take over the line. Renamed the "South Devon Railway Trust", the railway was renamed the South Devon Railway, and the volunteer supporting body renamed the South Devon Railway Association. The trust took over the running of the line on 1 January 1991, with the first train running on 29 March 1991. The trust subsequently bought the freehold of the line from DVR plc on 8 February 2010. The South Devon Railway was named the Heritage Railway of the Year in 2007.

== Accidents and incidents ==
A child almost fell from a carriage on 22 June 2017 whilst the train was in motion between Totnes Riverside and Buckfastleigh. This was due to part of the floor in a toilet being missing following repairs to the carriage's brake system. The Rail Accident Investigation Branch investigated what it called a "dangerous occurrence". It released its report into the accident on 30 January 2018. The investigation concluded that the railway's Safety Management System at the time was inadequate, and that there were deficiencies in the system to ensure vehicles were fit for service. One recommendation was made. It was revealed that the Office of Rail and Road (ORR) had issued an improvement notice in July 2017 and that the notice was deemed to have been complied with in November 2017. The South Devon Railway was prosecuted by the ORR in May 2018 on a charge of failing to ensure people in its employ and passengers were not exposed to risk of harm. It pleaded guilty and was fined £40,000 with costs of £13,205 and a victim surcharge of £170.

== Route ==
Point	Coordinates (Links to map resources)	OS Grid Ref	Notes
Buckfastleigh	50.4828°N 3.7688°W	SX74606627	
Staverton	50.4610°N 3.7149°W	SX78376375	
Nappers Halt	50.4613°N 3.7026°W	SX79246377	
Totnes (Riverside)	50.4398°N 3.6858°W	SX80386135	

The line is 6 miles and 51 chains long (10.7 km). It stretches from Totnes (Riverside) to Buckfastleigh. Staverton is the only intermediate station on the line which is served by all trains; however, Nappers Halt is a short distance to the east of Staverton and is served by occasional special trains. Just north of Staverton is a signal box known as Bishops Bridge where there is the only passing loop on the line.

For most of its route, the line runs to the east or north of the River Dart. This means that the river views are best seen to the left of the train when facing Buckfastleigh and to the right of the train when facing Totnes.

== Services ==
Trains on the South Devon Railway operate daily from late March to the end of October. On most days, a single train set operates, providing four journeys a day in each direction. On busy days (most of the school holidays), two train sets operate, providing more journeys.

== In television and film ==
- Escape (1948)
- Where There's A Will (1955)
- And Then There Were None (2015)
- Beyond Paradise (2023)

== Rolling stock ==
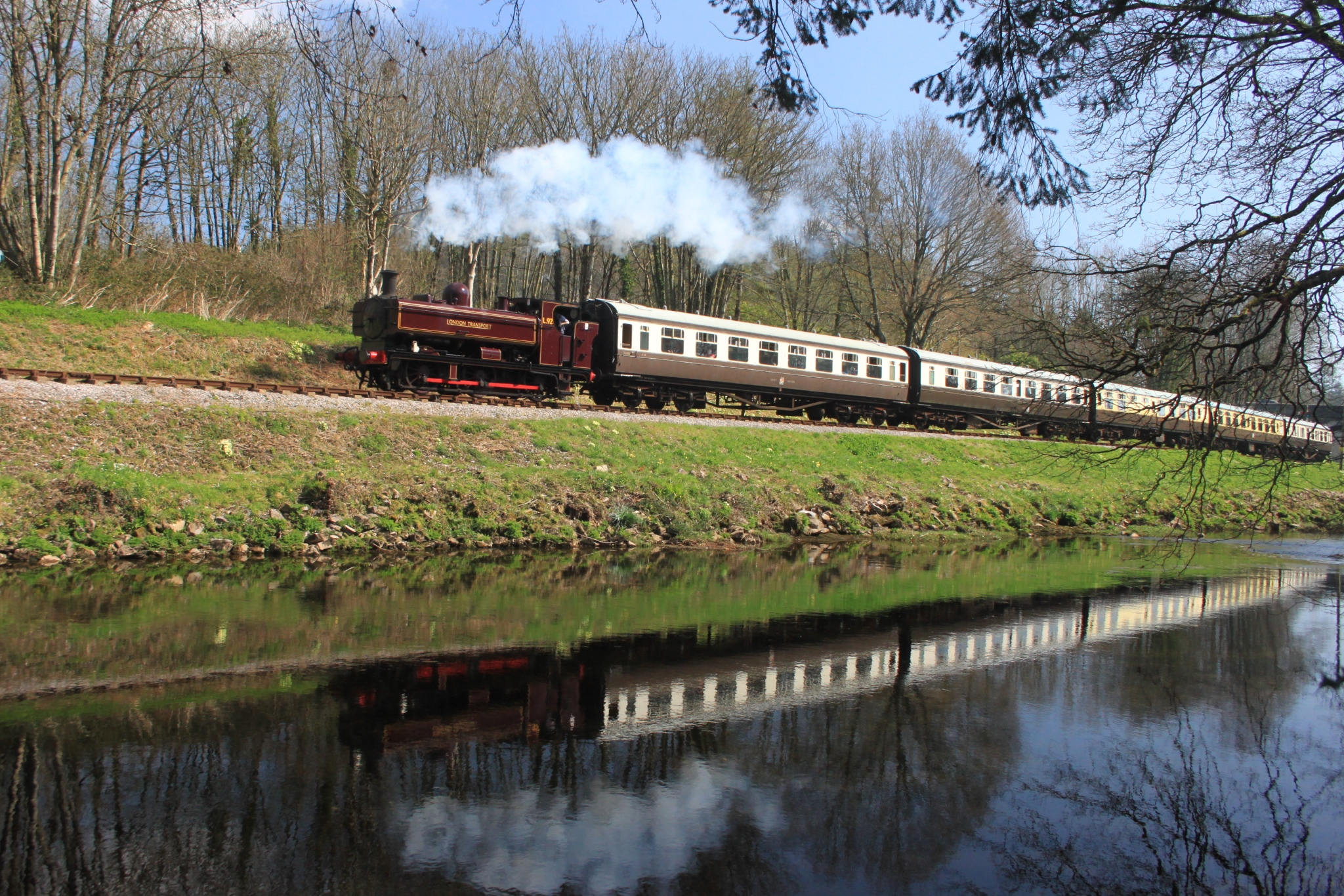
GWR 5700 Class L92 near Staverton

The rolling stock preserved on the line include many examples of steam locomotives typical of the Great Western Railway types that would have once worked on it, such as GWR 1400 Class number 1420. There are also other types of steam locomotives and a number of diesel locomotives. As well as those used in service, there are a number that are undergoing overhaul or restoration, or are displayed in non-working condition. The most significant one of these is Tiny, a South Devon Railway 0-4-0VB shunting locomotive on display in the museum at Buckfastleigh station. This is the only original 7 ft (2,134 mm) broad gauge locomotive still in existence in the United Kingdom.

There are a number of historic coaches in use, including two Great Western Railway "Super Saloons", some coaches once used in the Royal Train, and three auto coaches that were used on small branch lines such as this.

== Signal boxes ==
Signal Boxes
Name	Image	Location	Notes
Buckfastleigh North signal box		Buckfastleigh	Original signal box at Buckfastleigh station
Buckfastleigh South signal box		Buckfastleigh	Built during preservation
Bishops Bridge Signal box		Staverton	Former Athelney signal box
Staverton signal box		Staverton	Original signal box at Staverton station
Ashburton Junction signal box		Totnes	Former Cradley Heath signal box. Rebuilt 2004.

== South Devon Railway Engineering ==
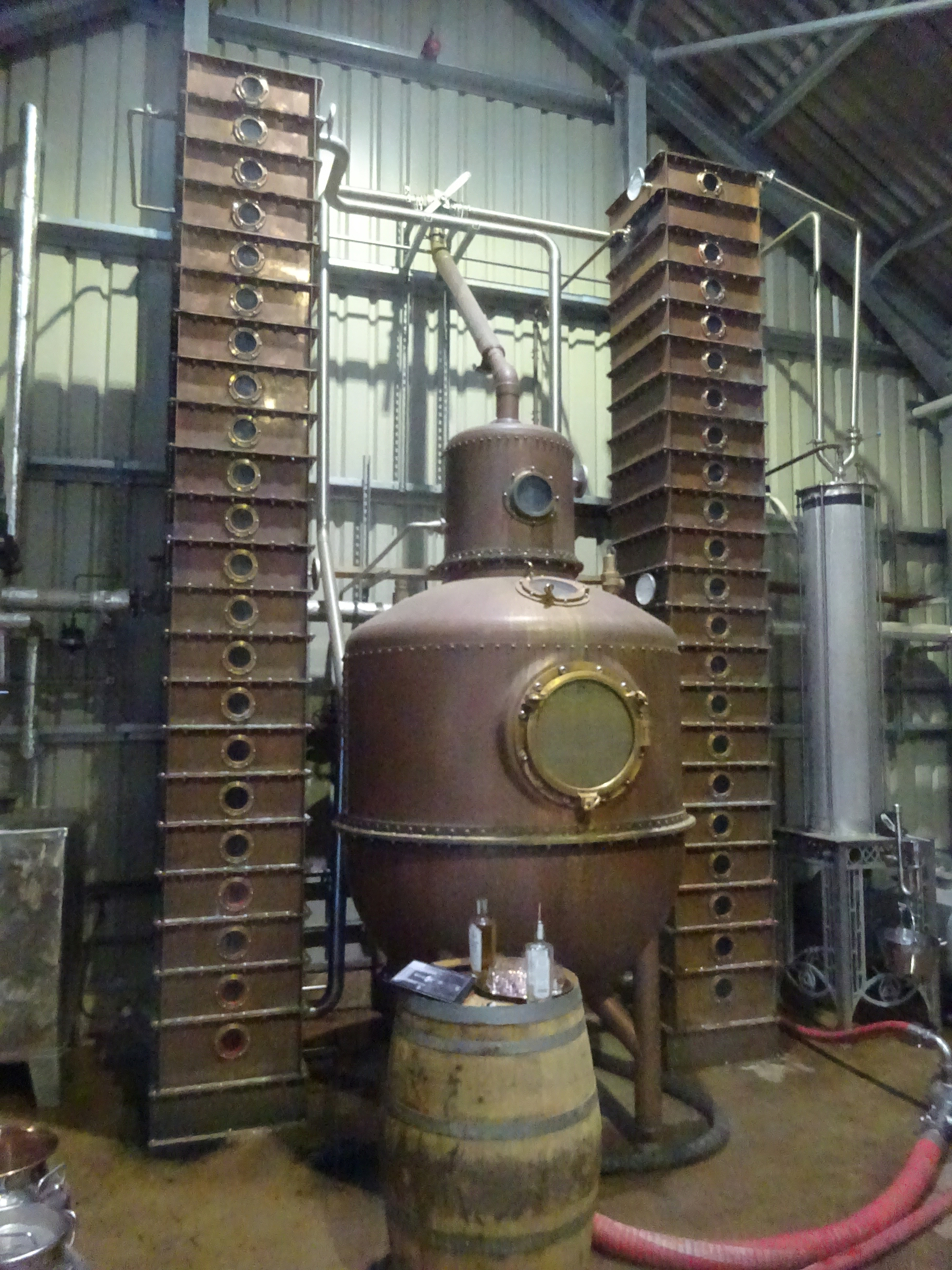
The Nautilus steampunk-style still at The Oxford Artisan Distillery was built by SDRE

The railway has its own engineering workshops, run as South Devon Railway Engineering Ltd (SDRE), which restores locomotives and rolling stock for the South Devon Railway.

SDRE also undertakes external contracts. For example, it built the two stills at The Oxford Artisan Distillery, nicknamed "Nautilus" and "Nemo" after the submarine and its captain in the Jules Verne 1870 science fiction novel Twenty Thousand Leagues Under the Seas. The stills were built in copper using a steampunk style.
