= Buckfastleigh railway station =

Heritage railway station in Devon, England

Buckfastleigh
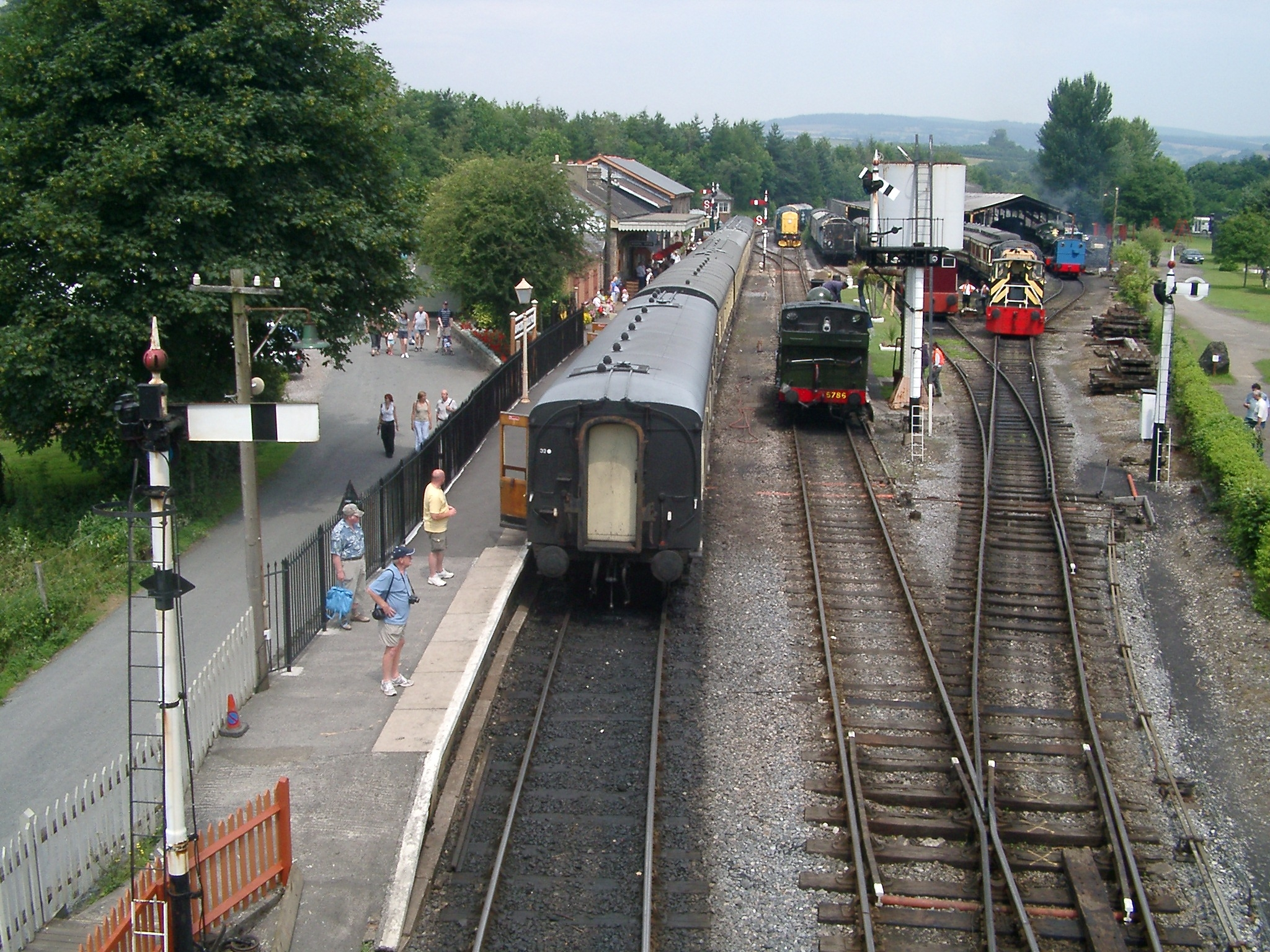

General information
- Location: Buckfastleigh, Teignbridge; England
- Coordinates: 50.48284°N 3.76877°W
- Grid reference: SX746662
- System: Station on heritage railway
- Operator: South Devon Railway
- Platforms: 1

History
- Original company: Buckfastleigh, Totnes and South Devon Railway
- Pre-grouping: Great Western Railway
- Post-grouping: Great Western Railway

Key dates
- 1 May 1872: Opened
- 3 November 1958: Closed to passengers
- 1969: Reopened
Location

Buckfastleigh railway station is situated on the South Devon Railway, a heritage railway in Devon, England. It serves the town of Buckfastleigh.

== History ==
The station was opened by the Buckfastleigh, Totnes and South Devon Railway on 1 May 1872. The railway was amalgamated into the Great Western Railway in 1897 and this in turn was nationalised into British Railways on 1 January 1948. A camping coach was positioned here by the Western Region from 1956 to 1961.

The station closed to passengers in November 1958 although goods traffic on the line continued until 10 September 1962.

It was re-opened as the Dart Valley Railway, a heritage railway, on 5 April 1969. The South Devon Railway Trust took over the running of the line on 1 January 1991.

In 1971 Buckfastleigh became the terminus of the line when the route beyond the station was closed to allow improvements to the A38 road. Workshops have since been provided for restoring and repairing the locomotives and rolling stock used on the railway.

The goods shed has been converted to a railway museum and this is the home of Tiny the last remaining broad gauge locomotive.

Teignbridge District Council gave the railway permission to build a brand new locomotive restoration facility in July 2026.

== Services ==
The station is served by trains on all operating days of the South Devon Railway. Trains operate daily from late March to the end of October. On most days a single train set operates, providing four journeys a day in each direction. On busy days two train sets may operate, providing more journeys.

Preceding station	Heritage railways	Following station
Staverton	South Devon Railway	Terminus
