= List of museums in Devon =

This list of museums in Devon, England, contains museums which are defined for this context as institutions (including nonprofit organizations, government entities, and private businesses) that collect and care for objects of cultural, artistic, scientific, or historical interest and make their collections or related exhibits available for public viewing. Also included are non-profit art galleries and university art galleries. Museums that exist only in cyberspace (i.e., virtual museums) are not included.

== Museums ==
| Name | Image | Town/City | Region | Type | Summary |
|---|---|---|---|---|---|
| A La Ronde | | Exmouth | East Devon | Historic house | Operated by the National Trust, late 18th century sixteen-sided house with unusual decorations and collections |
| Allhallows Museum | | Honiton | East Devon | Local | local history, Honiton lace collection, Honiton pottery, palaeontology, toys, war memorabilia |
| Ariel Centre | | Totnes | South Hams | Art | art centre with gallery and theatre, part of King Edward VI Community College |
| Arlington Court | | Arlington | North Devon | Historic house | Operated by the National Trust, early 19th-century country house with collection of antique furniture and an eclectic collection of family memorabilia, National Trust Carriage Museum, gardens |
| Ashburton Museum | | Ashburton | Teignbridge | Local | local history, culture, collection of Native American artifacts |
| Axminster Museum | | Axminster | East Devon | Local | Local history, culture, industry, agriculture |
| Barnstaple and North Devon Museum | | Barnstaple | Torridge | Local history | Devon County Council |
| Barometer World | | Merton | Torridge | Science & Technology | Shop (sells, repairs and restores Barometers) and Museum collection which houses the famous Tempest Prognosticator. |
| Berry Pomeroy Castle | | Totnes | South Hams | Historic house | Operated by English Heritage, ruins of a large late-medieval fortified house and castle |
| Bicclescombe Watermill | | Ilfracombe | North Devon | Mill | information, late 18th century mill |
| Bideford Railway Heritage Centre | | Bideford | Torridge | Railway | |
| Bill Douglas Cinema Museum | | Exeter | Exeter | Media | History of film and visual media, media memorabilia, part of the University of Exeter |
| Bishopsteignton Heritage Archive and Museum | | Bishopsteignton | Teignbridge | Local | Local history, sometimes with global connections. Warm welcome, help with family and other histories. Located in over 300 year old school buildings. Large online catalogue. |
| Bomb Shelter | | Beer | East Devon | Local History | Small museum showing the story of a large bomb that didn't destroy the village. |
| Bovey Tracey Heritage Centre | | Bovey Tracey | Teignbridge | Local | information, local history, culture, located in the Bovey railway station |
| Bradley | | Newton Abbot | Teignbridge | Historic house | Operated by the National Trust, medieval manor house, riverside meadows and woodland |
| Braunton and District Museum | | Braunton | North Devon | Local | information, local history, agriculture, maritime heritage, industry, railway |
| Braunton Countryside Centre | | Braunton | North Devon | Natural history | environment of the coastal and farmed landscapes surrounding Braunton, farming and Braunton Marshes |
| Bridge Mill | | Bridgerule | Torridge | Mill | restored 19th century watermill |
| Britannia Museum | | Dartmouth | South Hams | Maritime | history of the Britannia Royal Naval College, open by pre-booked tour |
| Brixham Battery Heritage Centre | | Brixham | Torbay | Military | Local World War II military history, gun battery, pill box, tours of battery garden |
| Brixham Heritage Museum | | Brixham | Torbay | Local | local history, fishing and ship building industries |
| Buckland Abbey | | Buckland Monachorum | West Devon | Historic house | Operated by the National Trust, abbey estate and grounds with exhibits about explorers Sir Richard Grenville and Sir Francis Drake |
| Budlake Old Post Office | | Broadclyst | East Devon | Historic house | Operated by the National Trust, 1950s period cottage post office, near Killerton |
| Burton Art Gallery and Museum | | Bideford | Torridge | Art | watercolours, oil paintings, prints and drawings, decorative arts, contemporary crafts, Napoleonic ship models, also local history |
| Bygones Museum | | Torquay | Torbay | Multiple | Victorian period shop and room displays, model railway and memorabilia, military displays, 1940s and 50s shopping arcade, amusement machines, model buildings, P&O memorabilia |
| Cadhay | | Ottery St Mary | East Devon | Historic house | Elizabethan manor house and gardens |
| Castle Drogo | | Drewsteignton | West Devon | Historic house | Operated by the National Trust, early 20th-century castle house designed by Sir Edwin Lutyens, gardens |
| Chambercombe Manor | | Ilfracombe | North Devon | Historic house | Norman manor house with period furniture ranging from Elizabethan to Victorian times |
| Clovelly | | Clovelly | North Devon | Historic house | Historic fishing village that includes the childhood home of the Victorian author and social reformer Charles Kingsley, 1930s fisherman's cottage |
| Clyston Mill | | Broadclyst | East Devon | Mill | Operated by the National Trust, water-powered corn mill, near Killerton |
| Cobbaton Combat Collection | | Chittlehampton | North Devon | Military | military artifacts, most from World War II |
| Coldharbour Mill | | Uffculme | Mid Devon | Industry | Working spinning mill textile museum, historic steam engines (run on Bank Holidays), dolls house exhibition, model railway, schools education programme |
| Coleton Fishacre | | Kingswear | South Hams | Historic house | Operated by the National Trust, 1920s Arts and Crafts style country home for Rupert D'Oyly Carte, gardens |
| Colyton Heritage Centre | | Colyton | East Devon | Local | local history |
| Combe Martin Museum | | Combe Martin | North Devon | Local | local history |
| Compton Castle | | Marldon | South Hams | Historic house | Operated by the National Trust, medieval fortress house |
| Crediton Museum | | Crediton | Mid Devon | Local | local history, operated by the Crediton Area History and Museum Society |
| Cricklepit Mill | | Exeter | Exeter | Mill | 19th-century watermill, headquarters and visitor centre for the Devon Wildlife Trust |
| Crownhill Fort | | Plymouth | Plymouth | Military | Victorian era fort with artillery, operated by Landmark Trust |
| Dartmoor Prison Museum | | Princetown | West Devon | Prison | History of Dartmoor Prison |
| Dartmouth Castle | | Dartmouth | South Hams | Military | Operated by the English Heritage, coastal fortress with gun battery |
| Dartmouth Museum | | Dartmouth | South Hams | Local | Located in a 1640 merchant's house, maritime and local history, several local and maritime history collections, also houses The Henley Collection and the Dawe Collection of ships in bottles |
| Dartmoor National Park Visitor Centre - Princetown | | Princetown | West Devon | Multiple | one of three visitor centres for Dartmoor National Park, exhibits on local history, culture, wildlife, art |
| Dawlish Museum | | Dawlish | Teignbridge | Local | information, local history, culture, industry, porcelain, natural history, dolls and toys |
| Devon Railway Centre | | Bickleigh | Mid Devon | Railway | 2 ft 610mm) gauge passenger railway, narrow gauge collection, miniature railway, model railway layouts |
| Devonport Naval Heritage Centre | | Plymouth | Plymouth | Maritime | Artifacts from the Royal Navy, open by appointment |
| Dingles Fairground Heritage Centre | | Lifton | West Devon | Amusement | fairground art and memorabilia, vintage rides, stalls and shows, industrial and road steam engines, vintage vehicles, roadsigns, vintage machinery |
| Elizabethan House | | Plymouth | Plymouth | Historic House | |
| Dunkeswell Airfield Heritage Centre | | Dunkeswell | East Devon | Military | history of RAF Dunkeswell in World War II, |
| Exeter's Underground Passages | | Exeter | Exeter | History | medieval underground passages built for supplying drinking water |
| Exmouth Museum | | Exmouth | East Devon | Local | local history, culture |
| Fairlynch Museum | | Budleigh Salterton | East Devon | Multiple | housed in an early 19th-century house with a thatched roof, local history, costumes and lace collection, archeology, geology |
| Finch Foundry | | Sticklepath | West Devon | Technology | Operated by the National Trust, water-powered forge |
| Fursdon | | Cadbury | Mid Devon | Historic house | farming estate dating back over 700 years, costume collection, garden |
| Golden Hind Museum, Brixham | | Brixham | Torbay | Maritime | museum ship replica of Sir Francis Drake's ship Golden Hind |
| Great Torrington Heritage Museum | | Great Torrington | Torridge | Local | local history |
| Greenway Estate | | Galmpton | Torbay | Historic house | Operated by the National Trust, Georgian house owned by author Agatha Christie, 1950s decor with collections of archaeology, Tunbridgeware, silver, botanical china and books, gardens |
| Hartland Abbey | | Hartland | Torridge | Historic house | Former medieval monastery, country home with collections of pictures, furniture and porcelain, gardens |
| Hartland Quay Museum | | Hartland | Torridge | Maritime | shipwrecks, natural history, coastal trades, geology and history of Hartland Quay, located in the Hartland Quay Hotel |
| Hele Corn Mill | | Hele | North Devon | Mill | 16th century working watermill, tea room and shop |
| Hemyock Castle | | Hemyock | Mid Devon | Historic house | Open on Bank Holidays, medieval manor house ruins |
| Holsworthy Museum | | Holsworthy | Torridge | Local | local history, period rooms |
| House of Marbles | | Bovey Tracey | Teignbridge | Art | working glass and games factory set in an historic pottery, exhibits of glass, games, marbles, and Bovey Pottery |
| Ilfracombe Museum | | Ilfracombe | North Devon | Multiple | local history, natural history, Victoriana, maritime artifacts, minerals, archaeology, maps, paintings, photos, military items and costumes |
| Kelly House | | Kelly | West Devon | Historic house | Georgian country house & Bed & Breakfast currently under restoration |
| Kelly Mine | | Lustleigh | Teignbridge | Mining | Former iron mine with equipment and mill with Californian stamps |
| Killerton | | Broadclyst | East Devon | Historic house | Operated by the National Trust, 18th century estate and garden, costume collection |
| Kingsbridge Cookworthy Museum | | Kingsbridge | South Hams | Local | Local history, social history, trades and crafts, William Cookworthy porcelain, Victorian kitchen, costumes, agriculture, farm machinery, garden |
| Kirkham House | | Paignton | Torbay | Historic house | Operated by English Heritage, late medieval stone house |
| Knightshayes Court | | Tiverton | Mid Devon | Historic house | Operated by the National Trust, Victorian country house designed by William Burges, garden |
| Lyn and Exmoor Museum | | Lynton | North Devon | Local | Local history, natural history, culture |
| Marker's Cottage | | Broadclyst | East Devon | Historic house | Operated by the National Trust, medieval cob cottage with a thatched roof, near Killerton |
| Merchant's House, Plymouth | | Plymouth | Plymouth | Historic house | 17th-century house, home to three Plymouth mayors, includes antique artifacts, prison equipment, Victorian school room, an entire chemist's shop |
| Mortehoe Museum | | Mortehoe | North Devon | Local | local history, maritime heritage, agriculture |
| Morwellham Quay | | Tavistock | West Devon | Open air | Restored 19th century village, docks and quays, a restored ship, copper mine tour by train, Victorian farm, nature reserve |
| Museum of Barnstaple & North Devon | | Barnstaple | North Devon | Multiple | local history, natural history, culture, Royal Devon Yeomanry and Devonshire Regiment, archaeology, decorative arts; also known as Barnstaple Museum |
| Museum of British Surfing | | Braunton | North Devon | Sports | surfing in the UK, surfboard collection |
| Museum of Dartmoor Life | | Okehampton | North Devon | Multiple | Local history, culture, industry, trades, period rooms, art |
| Newcomen Engine House | | Dartmouth | South Hams | Technology | Newcomen steam engine and history of Thomas Newcomen |
| Newton Abbot Town & GWR Museum | | Newton Abbot | Teignbridge | Multiple | local history, Great Western Railway, art |
| North Devon Maritime Museum | | Appledore | North Devon | Maritime | History of shipbuilding and seafaring in the village |
| Old Bakery, Manor Mill & Forge | | Branscombe | East Devon | Historic site | Operated by the National Trust, restored bakery, water-powered forge and forge |
| Otterton Mill | | Otterton | East Devon | Mill | 19th century water mill, bakery, shop |
| Overbeck's | | Salcombe | South Hams | Historic house | Operated by the National Trust, Edwardian house with collections of stuffed animals, model ships, nautical tools and photos, doll houses |
| Plough Arts Centre | | Great Torrington | Torridge | Art | Includes visual art gallery, theatre and cinema |
| Plymouth City Museum and Art Gallery | | Plymouth | Plymouth | Multiple | Local history, natural history, art, archaeology, decorative arts |
| Powderham Castle | | Powderham | Exeter | Historic house | Medieval castle, home of the Earl of Devon, Victorian kitchen, deer park, gardens |
| Royal Albert Memorial Museum & Art Gallery | | Exeter | Exeter | Multiple | Art, natural history, local history, decorative arts, archaeology, coins, costumes, world culture |
| Salcombe Lifeboat Station | | Salcombe | South Hams | Maritime | History of the RNLI lifeboat station in Salcombe |
| Salcombe Maritime Museum | | Salcombe | South Hams | Maritime | ship portraits, shipwreck and rescue, shipbuilding, local history |
| Saltram House | | Plympton | Plymouth | Historic house | Operated by the National Trust, Robert Adam-designed Georgian house with original decor, plasterwork and furnishings |
| Sand, Devon | | Sidbury | East Devon | Historic house | Elizabethan manor house, garden |
| Seaton Museum | | Seaton | East Devon | Local | also known as Axe Valley Heritage Museum, local history, archaeology, natural history, geology |
| Sidmouth Museum | SidMusExt | Sidmouth | East Devon | Local | local history, natural history of the Jurassic Coast |
| Smeaton's Tower | | Plymouth | Plymouth | Maritime | 18th century former lighthouse |
| South Devon Railway: Buckfastleigh | | Buckfastleigh | Teignbridge | Railway | Headquarters and museum for the South Devon Railway, steam locomotive depot and workshops |
| South Molton Museum | | South Molton | North Devon | Multiple | local history, trades, agriculture, culture, archaeology, toys, household items, railway |
| St Nicholas Priory | | Exeter | Exeter | Historic house | Furnished as an Elizabethan town house in 1602 |
| Start Point Lighthouse | | Start Point | South Hams | Maritime | Lighthouse open for tours |
| Tamar Belle Visitor Centre | | Bere Ferrers | West Devon | Railway | Victorian railway station with equipment, rolling stock and memorabilia |
| Tavistock Museum | | Tavistock | West Devon | Local | local history |
| Teignmouth & Shaldon Museum | | Teignmouth | Teignbridge | Multiple | maritime and local history, art, area railway and air transport |
| Tiverton Castle | | Tiverton | Mid Devon | Historic house | Medieval castle manor house, garden |
| Tiverton Museum of Mid Devon Life | | Tiverton | Mid Devon | Multiple | Local history, railroads, transport, social history, agriculture |
| Topsham Museum | | Topsham | Exeter | Multiple | maritime and local history, 17th century period rooms, natural history, local trades, memorabilia of film star Vivien Leigh |
| Torquay Museum | | Torquay | Torbay | Multiple | local history, Agatha Christie, artifacts from Kents Cavern, archaeology, replica farmhouse interior, Ancient Egypt, and world jewellery |
| Torre Abbey | | Torquay | Torbay | Multiple | Former abbey and country house, art gallery, collections of fine and decorative art, gardens |
| Totnes Castle | | Totnes | South Hams | Military | Operated by English Heritage, preserved Norman motte-and-bailey castle |
| Totnes Elizabethan House Museum | | Totnes | South Ham] | Historic house | 1575 Tudor house with period rooms, local history including computer inventor Charles Babbage, Saxon coins |
| Totnes Fashion and Textiles Museum | | Totnes | South Hams | Fashion | Located in Bogan House, clothing and accessories from the 18th to 20th centuries from the Devonshire Collection of Period Costume |
| Totnes Guildhall | | Totnes | South Hams | Historic site | 16th century Tudor guild hall, magistrate's court and prison |
| Totnes Image Bank and Rural Archive | | Totnes | South Hams | Photography | changing exhibits of historic area photographs from its collections, cameras and photography equipment, located in the town watermill |
| Ugbrooke | | Chudleigh | Teignbridge | Historic house | Estate dating to the 12th century, house and grounds remodeled in the 18th century by Robert Adam and Capability Brown |
| University of Exeter Galleries | | Exeter | Exeter | Art | part of the University of Exeter, galleries in Northcote House and Queen's Building |
| Upottery Heritage Centre | | Upottery | East Devon | Military | operated by the South West Airfields Heritage Trust, history of RAF Upottery in World War II |
| Valiant Soldier | | Buckfastleigh | Teignbridge | Historic house | information, 1960s period pub and home |
| Watermouth Castle | | Watermouth | North Devon | Amusement | Theme park with collection of Victorian antiques, domestic tools, amusement machines, mechanical instruments, toys, model trains |
| West of England Transport Collection | | Winkleigh | Torridge | Transportation | private collection of transport vehicles open to the public once a year |
| Whimple Heritage Centre | | Whimple | East Devon | Cider/Local | History of a Devon cider-making village website |
| William Pengelly Cave Studies Trust Museum | | Buckfastleigh | Teignbridge | Natural history | caves, geology, fossils, conservation |

== Defunct museums ==
- Barnstaple Heritage Centre, Barnstaple, closed in 2016
- Bradworthy Transport Museum, Holsworthy, website, closed in 2010
- High Cross House, Totnes, 1930s International Modernist style house with designed furniture and furnishings, paintings, sculptures and ceramics, built for the headmaster of Dartington Hall, closed in 2013
- Motoring Memories Museum, Colyford, closed in 2011
- Plymouth Dome, closed in 2006.
- Torrington 1646, Great Torrington, closed in 2015
- Yelverton Paperweight Centre, Yelverton

== See also ==
- Visitor attractions in Devon
