= Paperweight (disambiguation) =

Paperweight is a small solid object which is placed on top of books to keep the papers from blowing in the breeze or to keep a sheet from moving when painting with a brush as with Japanese calligraphy

Paperweight may also refer to:

- Paperweight (book), a collection of writings by Stephen Fry, first published in 1992
- Paperweight, a song by Joshua Radin featuring Schuyler Fisk
- Paperweight (album), 2016 studio album by British singer-songwriter Roo Panes

== See also ==
- Grammage, the area density of paper products, commonly denoted in grams per square metre (g/m2 or gsm) or pounds (lb) per ream.
- Yelverton Paperweight Centre, a paperweight museum and supplier in Leg O'Mutton, Yelverton, in the English county of Devon
- The Purloined Paperweight, an alternative title to Company for Henry, a novel by P. G. Wodehouse
