= Venning =

Venning is a surname. Notable people with the surname include:

- Alfred Venning (1846 - 1927), British colonial administrator and botanist
- Annabel Venning (born 1973), British author and journalist
- Dorothy Venning (1885–1942), British artist
- Howard Venning (1915–1995), Australian politician
- Ivan Venning (born 1945), Australian politician (son of Howard Venning)
- John Venning (1776–1858), English merchant and prison reformer
- Ralph Venning (c. 1621–1673 or 1674), English nonconformist Christian
- Rosamond Venning (1848–1928), English translator, art collector, folklorist
- Tom Venning, Australian politician (nephew of Ivan Venning, grandson of Howard Venning)
- Walter Venning (1882–1964), British army officer and administrator
- Walter Venning (philanthropist) (1781–1821), English merchant and philanthropist
