= Helen J. Cooper =

British chemist and academic

Helen Jill Cooper
- Education: University of Warwick
- Scientific career
- Workplaces: National High Magnetic Field Laboratory; Florida State University; University of Birmingham
- Thesis: Mass spectrometric studies of collisional activation and target capture. (1995)
- Doctoral advisor: Peter Derrick
- Website: Cooper Mass Spectrometry Group

Helen Jill Cooper FRSC is a British chemist who is Professor of mass spectrometry at the University of Birmingham. She serves as Deputy Head of the School of Chemistry and holds an Engineering and Physical Sciences Research Council Established Career Fellowship. Her research considers the development of native ambient mass spectrometry to enable direct analysis of intact proteins and protein assemblies from tissue.

== Early life and education ==
Cooper has said she became interested in science at the age of nine, when she learned that Isaac Newton had discovered gravity. Cooper attended King Edward VI Community College in Totnes. She completed undergraduate and graduate degrees in chemistry at the University of Warwick. After earning a doctorate, she was appointed an Experimental Officer in Fourier transform mass spectrometry. In 2000, she moved to the National High Magnetic Field Laboratory, which is located in Florida State University and continued her research in Fourier transform mass spectrometry.

== Research and career ==
In 2003, Cooper returned to the United Kingdom, where she was awarded a Wellcome Trust University Fellowship and joined the University of Birmingham. Cooper develops native ambient and ion mobility mass spectrometry to study protein structure a directly in the physiological environment (for example, in tissue). The large-scale study of proteins is known as proteomics. Cooper has shown that ambient mass spectrometry of proteins can provide the molecular-level sensitivity required to understand the processes that underpin disease, and can be used to inform the design of new pharmaceuticals. She has combined mass spectrometry with electron-capture dissociation and collision-induced dissociation. Cooper has studied the fragmentation processes and post-translational modifications of peptides. Such investigations are crucial to understand a range of biological processes.

She is an associate editor of the Journal of the American Society for Mass Spectrometry.

== Awards and honours ==
- 2007 Elected to the British Mass Spectrometry Society
- 2018 Elected Chair of the Management Advisory Panel for the EPSRC National Mass Spectrometry Facility
- 2022 Royal Society of Chemistry Analytical Division Theophilus Redwood Award
