= Leechwell =

Spring in Devon, England

Coordinates: 50.4292°N 3.6904°W

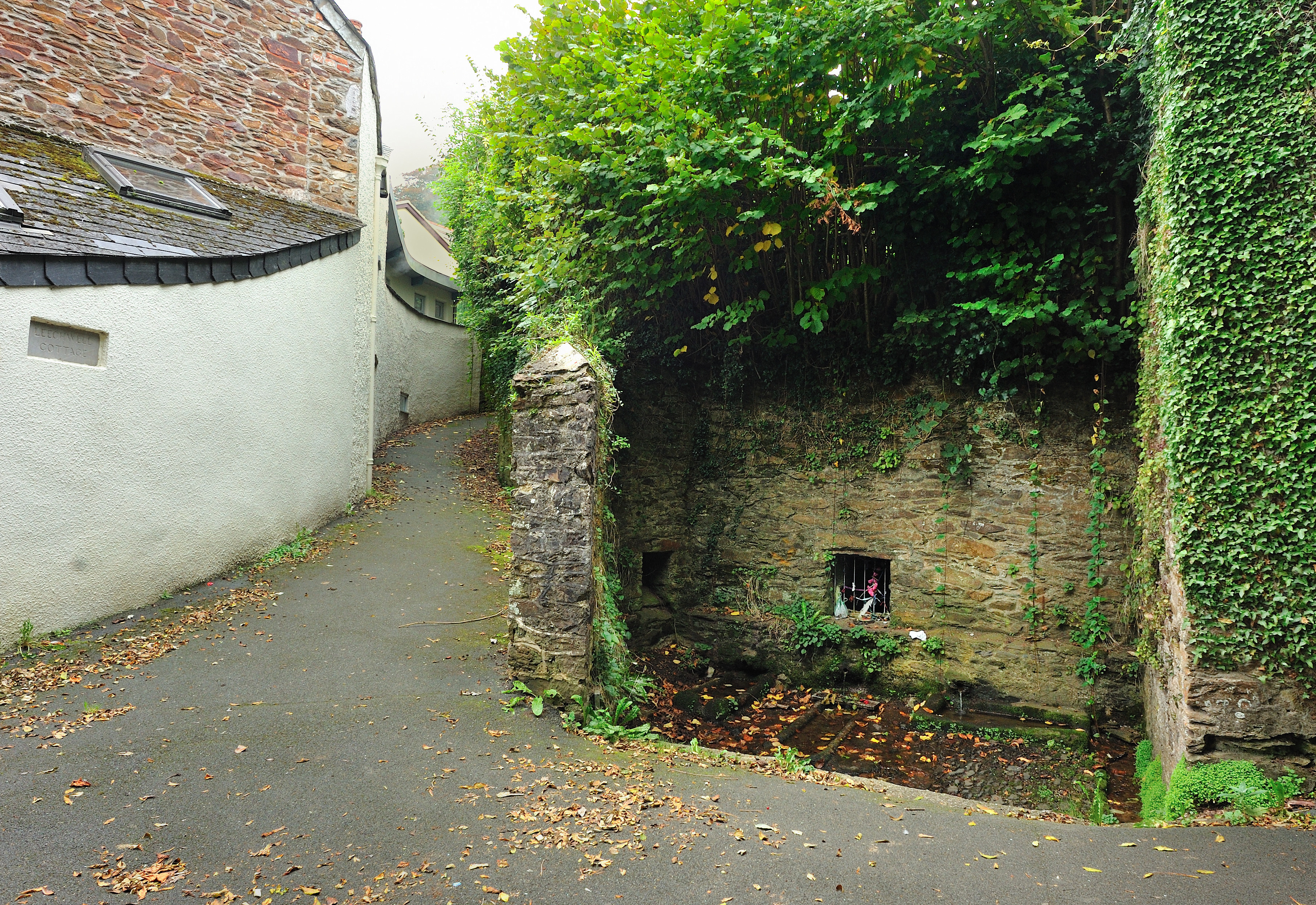
The Leechwell, showing its position in Leechwell Lane

The Leechwell is a set of three springs in Totnes, Devon, England. It was known in historical times for its supposed healing properties; this tradition continues among the town's large New Age community. The name is also applied to Leechwell Lane, which leads to the spring from three directions.

== History ==
=== Early history ===
Towards the end of the twelfth century, a leper hospital was established on the outskirts of Totnes. It is a popular belief in the town that lepers would walk up the high-walled Leechwell Lane to St Mary's church. However this belief cannot be traced back beyond the nineteenth century, and seems unlikely as lepers were ostracised, and the hospital was Church-run and would have had its own services. One branch of the lane leads to Maudlin (derived from Magdalen) Road, the site of the hospital, which is no longer extant after closing in about 1660.

=== Springs used for healing ===
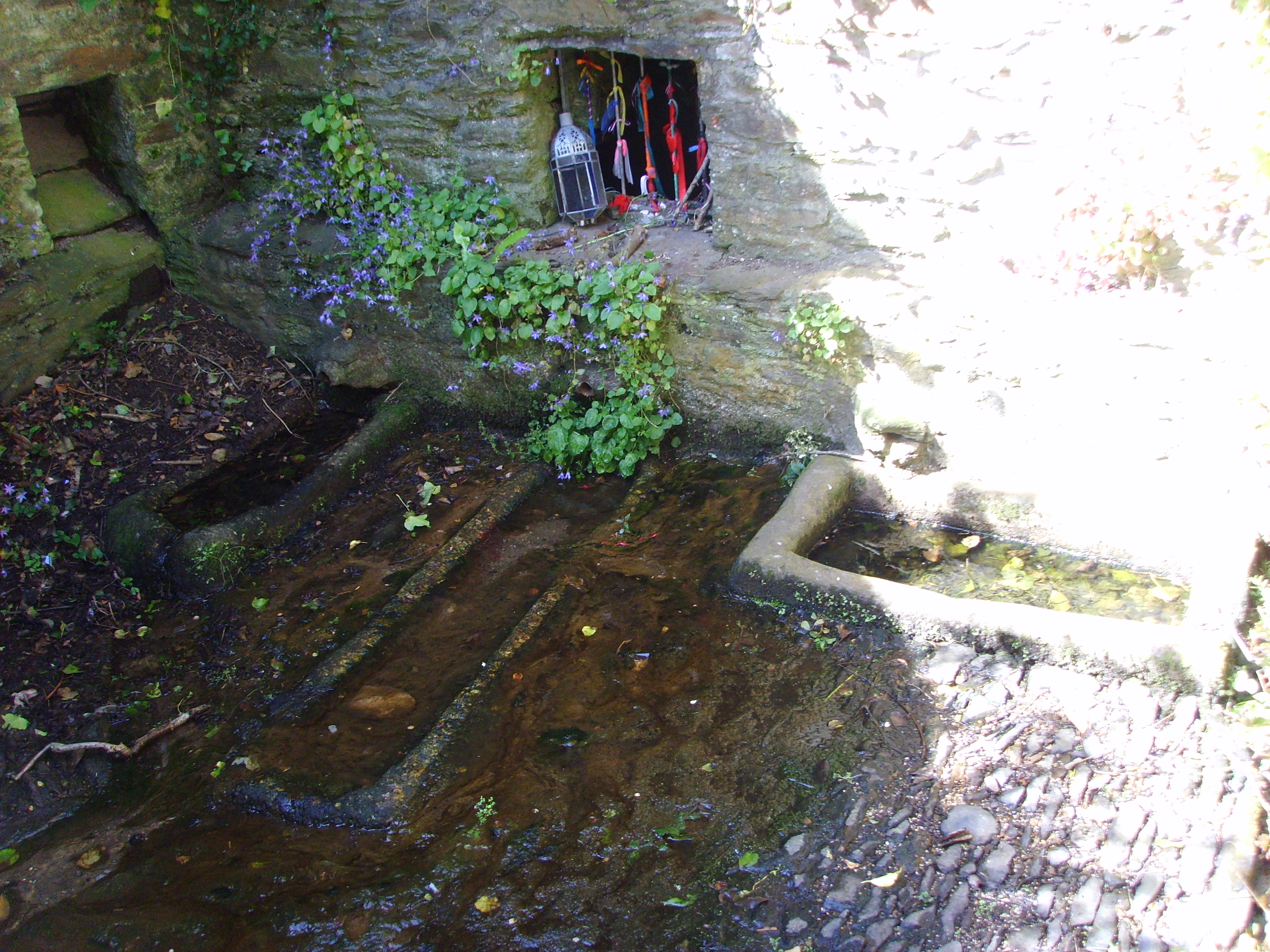
Close-up of the well, showing the springs (L-R) Toad, Long Crippler and Snake open at the base of the far wall, filling the three rectangular basins in the floor.

The springs were used by the townspeople for healing purposes, most probably for skin and eye conditions, and the troughs into which the outlets poured gained the names Toad, Long Crippler and Snake (long crippler being a local word for the slowworm). Their use became so popular that the Leechwell was included in a list of sites to be minded by two town wardens in 1444.

=== Modern times ===
In 2003 it was discovered that an overgrown and forgotten pool behind one of the walls was in fact a rare triangular immersion pool fed by the Leechwell's waters. This meant that the Leechwell complex was a trinity of trinities — the triple spring, the three-pronged path and triangular pool emphasising the importance of the number three in both Christianity and superstition.

The triangular immersion pool, which like the Leechwell is listed, will actually become a key feature of the Leechwell Garden, a new public open space. Work on the garden will start when the current building work is completed and the set of portacabins is removed. The design and implementation of the garden will be a joint collaboration between South Hams District Council and the Leechwell Garden Association.

== The Leechwell today ==
Although the Leechwell and its walls still stand, they have no formal protection, and the walls have twice been damaged in the name of improvement - by road building in the 1960s and again during work on a car park in 2006, which reduced that part of the wall by several feet. However, the site has many vocal defenders, especially the group Design Our Space, which did much to prevent inappropriate development of that area in the mid-2000s.

The Leechwell is used as a place of worship by the local New Age community, who often decorate it with ribbons and trinkets, but without causing damage to the stonework.

In recent years it appears that the right hand spring has moved its outlet point so that it no longer pours into the trough built for it. This might be due to the new houses built on the slopes above the area.
