= Museum of Dartmoor Life =

Museum in Devon, England

Coordinates: 50.7384°N 4.0034°W

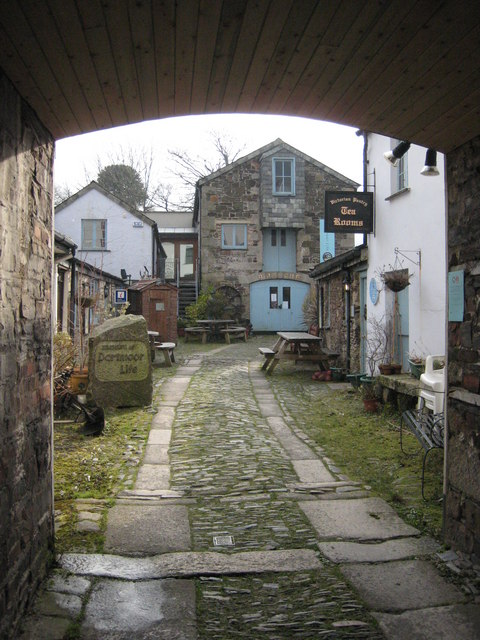
Entrance to the Museum of Dartmoor Life, Okehampton. The entrance to the museum courtyard is through this archway off West Street.

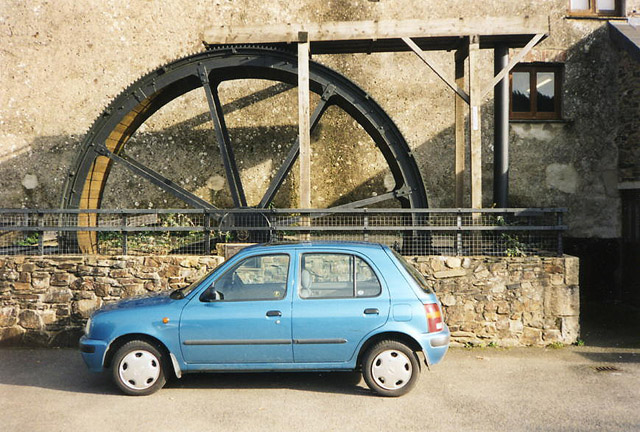
Waterwheel at the Museum of Dartmoor Life.

The Museum of Dartmoor Life (MDL) is a local museum in Okehampton, Devon, southwest England. It covers life in the Dartmoor area.

The museum opened in 1981. It is housed on three floors in an early 19th-century mill and there is a waterwheel at the museum. The collections concentrate on the social history of Dartmoor and Okehampton from prehistoric times to the present. The museum is run as an independent charitable trust with a board of trustees.

== See also ==
- List of museums in Devon
