= Devonshire Collection of Period Costume =

Collection of historic dress in Devon, England

Coordinates: 50°25′54″N 3°41′22″W

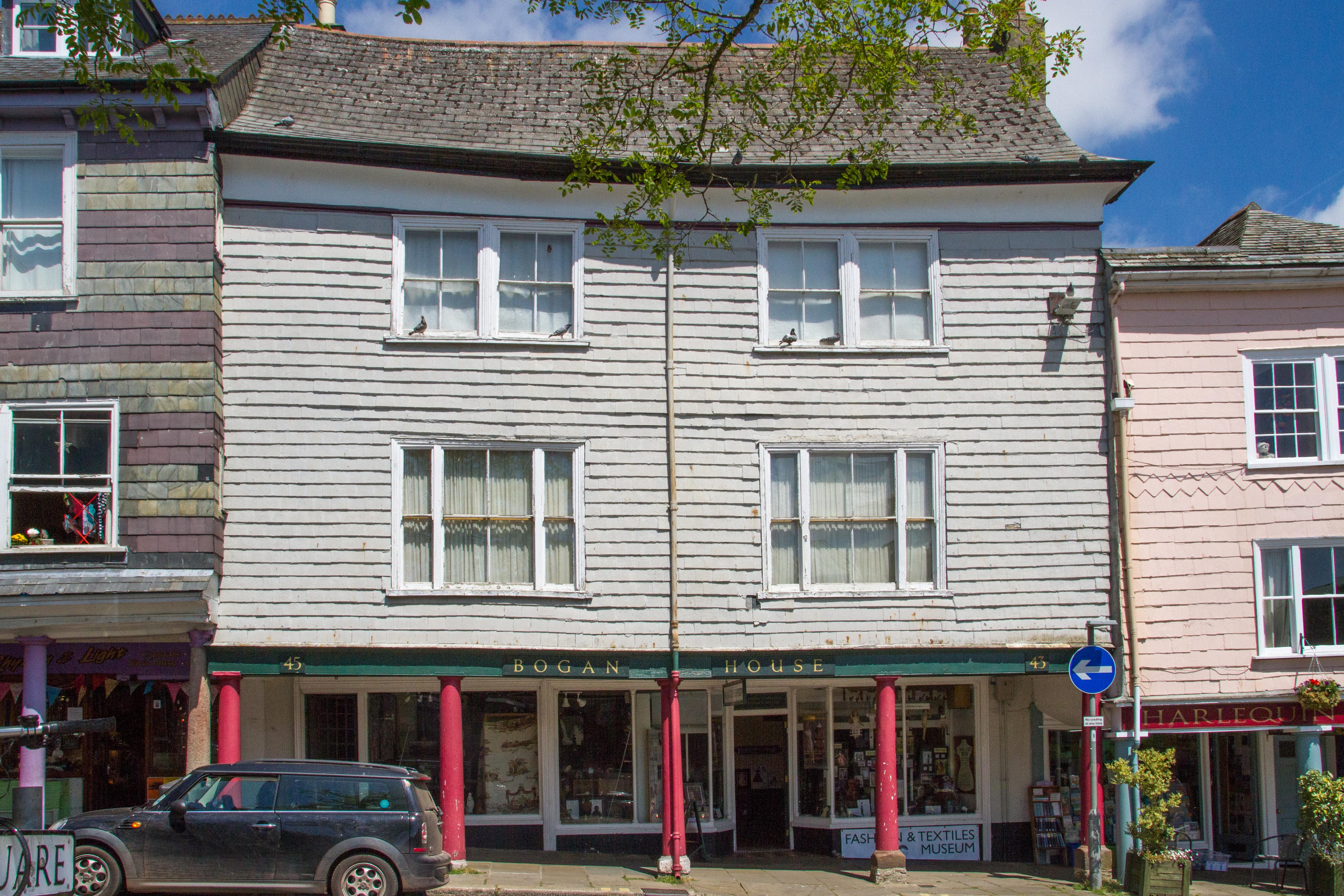
Bogan House

The Devonshire Collection of Period Costume is a collection of historic costumes housed in the Totnes Fashion and Textiles Museum in the town of Totnes, South Devon, in southwest England.

The collection includes clothing for men, women, and children, dating from the 17th to the 21st century. An annually updated exhibition was displayed until March, 31 2025 in Bogan House, a Tudor merchant's house at 43 High Street, Totnes. The Collection is housed in the University of Falmouth.

== See also ==
- List of museums in Devon
