= John Venning =

John Venning (1776–1858) was an English merchant, and a philanthropist interested in prison reform in Russia, where he was in business.

== Life ==
Born at Totnes, Devon, on 20 May 1776, he was the son of Walter Venning, a merchant, by his wife Mary Ann. He was educated at Totnes grammar school, and at age 14 was placed in the counting-house of Messrs. Jackson & Co., a firm of Russia merchants in London.

Venning went to St. Petersburg in 1793, and made as successful career there as a merchant. His interest in the condition of Russian prisons was aroused by his brother Walter Venning; and in 1819, on the foundation of the St. Petersburg Society for the Improvement of Prisons, he became its treasurer. After his brother's death in 1821, he visited prisons in Sweden, Germany, France, and England. He made reports and suggestions, which he submitted to the Russian government, meeting both Alexander I and Nicholas I. In addition to prison reforms, he worked for improvements in lunatic asylums.

In 1830, Venning settled in Norfolk, where he took part in benevolent and evangelical work. He died at Norwich on 11 April 1858.

== Family ==
Venning was married on 13 September, 1805 to the daughter of James Meybohm, a merchant of St. Petersburg. She survived him and left children.

== See also ==
Richard Knill

== Notes ==
Attribution

This article incorporates text from a publication now in the public domain: Lee, Sidney, ed. (1899). "Venning, John". Dictionary of National Biography. Vol. 58. London: Smith, Elder & Co.
