= Walter Venning (philanthropist) =

Walter Venning (1781–1821) was an English merchant and philanthropist, interested in prison reform.

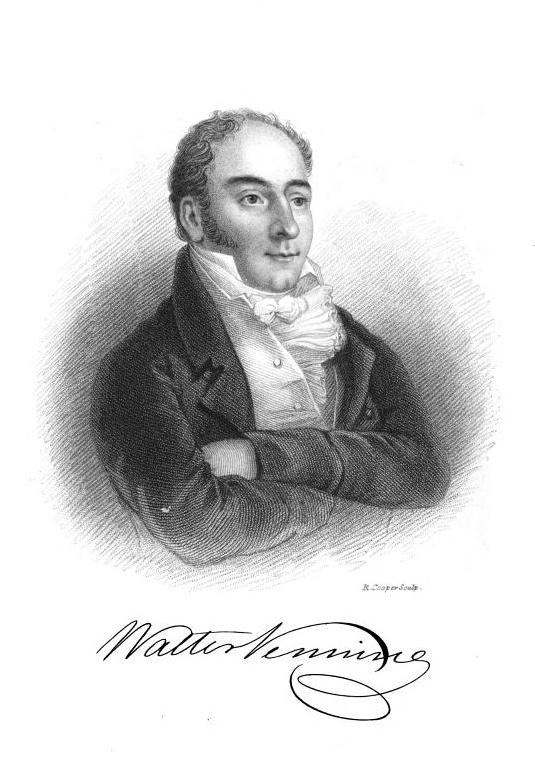
Walter Venning

== Life ==
The younger brother of John Venning, he was born at Totnes, Devon, on 15 November 1781. He began business life in London with an elder brother, William, but in 1799 he joined John in St. Petersburg, remaining there till 1807.

In 1810 Venning came under strong religious impressions, and after his mother's death joined a congregational church in 1811. On the formation in 1815 of the Society for the Improvement of Prison Discipline he became an active member; and when he returned to St. Petersburg in 1817, he founded a similar society there, in 1819.

Through Prince Alexander Golitsyn Venning obtained permission to visit Russian prisons. In 1818 he visited those of Moscow. He proposed to visit Denmark on a similar mission in August 1820, but was beaten back by weather. He died at his brother's country house on 10 January 1821 of typhus, caught while visiting a prison in St. Petersburg. He was buried at St. Petersburg, where a monument was erected to his memory by the St. Petersburg Society for the Improvement of Prisons.

== Notes ==
Attribution

This article incorporates text from a publication now in the public domain: Lee, Sidney, ed. (1899). "Venning, Walter". Dictionary of National Biography. Vol. 58. London: Smith, Elder & Co.
