= Brixham Heritage Museum =

Museum in Devon, England

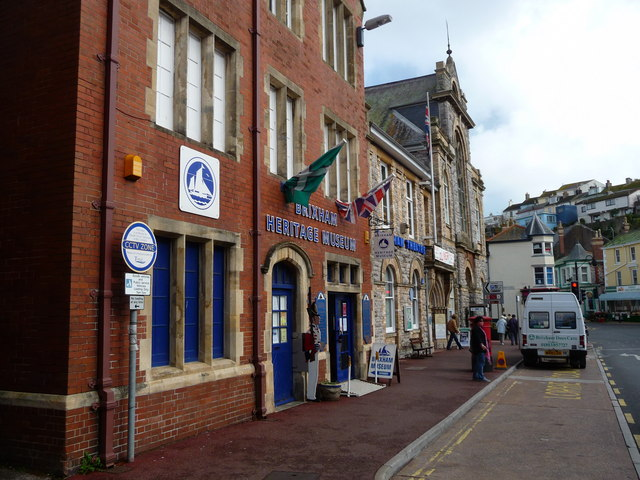
- The Museum

- Shown within Devon
- Location: Brixham, Devon, England
- Coordinates: 50.394277°N 3.516459°W
- Public transit access: Bus stop outside
- Parking: Brixham Central Car Park

Brixham Heritage Museum, also known as Brixham Museum is a museum in the town of Brixham, Devon, England.

== Exhibitions ==
There are exhibitions to the town's history in World War I and II, and in the Victorian era. There are also displays relating to the Napoleonic forts at nearby Berry Head, fishing and ropemaking in the town and to local archaeology and geology, including the Brixham bone caverns.
