= Paperweight =

Small object used to prevent papers from moving

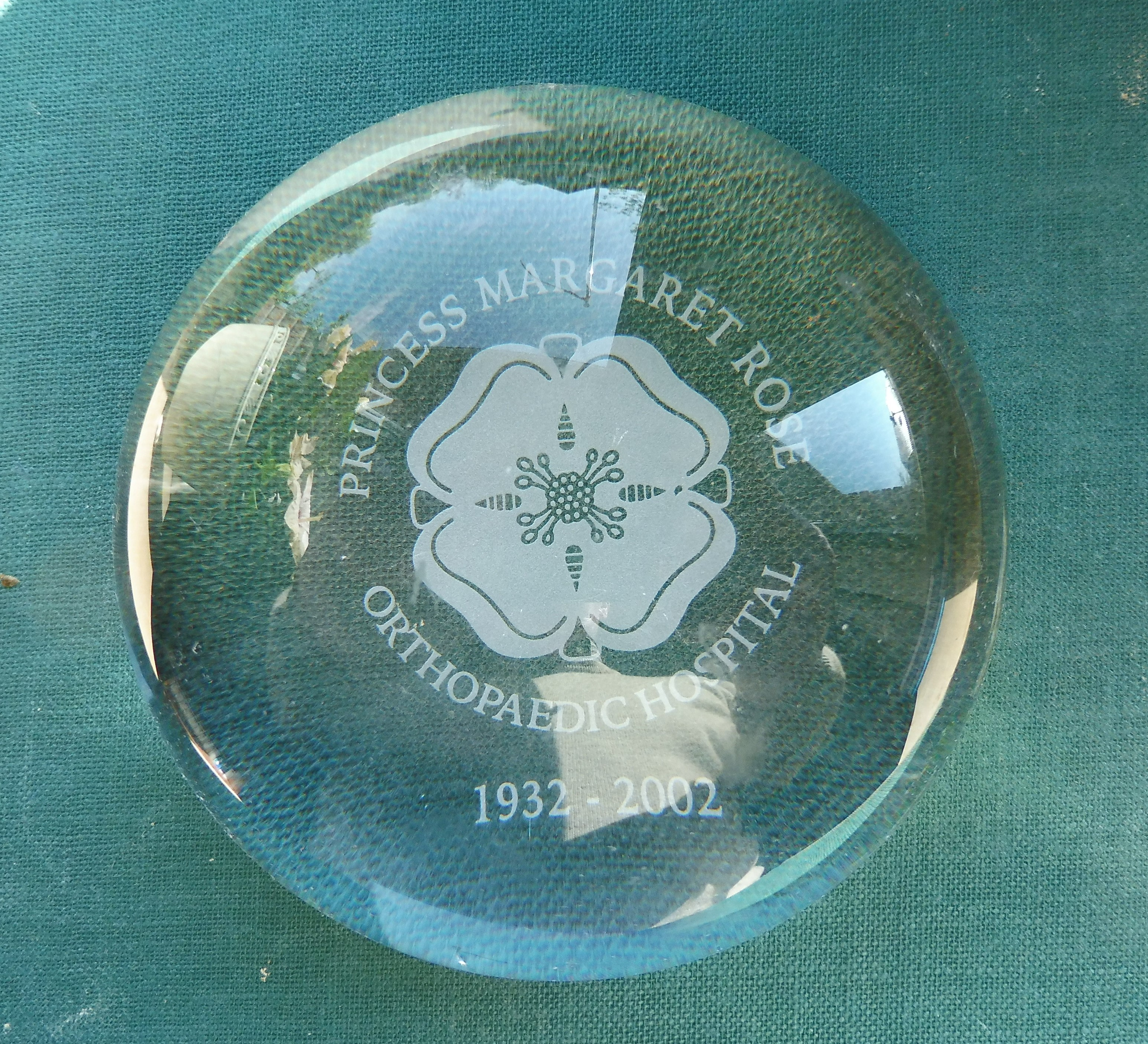
A glass paperweight commemorating the closure of the Princess Margaret Rose Orthopaedic Hospital (2002)

A paperweight is a small solid object heavy enough, when placed on top of papers, to keep them from blowing away in a breeze or from moving under the strokes of a painting brush (as with Chinese calligraphy). While any object, such as a stone, can serve as a paperweight, decorative paperweights of metal, glass, jade or other material are also produced, either by individual artisans or factories.

In the West, decorative paperweights are usually in limited editions, and are collected as works of fine glass art, some of which are also exhibited in museums. First produced in about 1845, particularly in France, such decorative paperweights declined in popularity before a revival in the mid-twentieth century.

== Basic features ==
Decorative glass paperweights have a flat or slightly concave base, usually polished but sometimes frosted, cut in one of several variations (e.g. star-cut bases have a multi-pointed star, while a diamond cut base has grooves cut in a criss-cross pattern), although a footed weight has a flange in the base. The ground on which the inner parts rest may be clear or colored, made of unfused sand, or resemble lace (latticinio). The domed top is usually faceted or cut and made of lead glass and may be coated with one or more thin layers of colored glass, and have windows cut through it to reveal the interior motif. The exact shape or profile of the dome varies from one artist or factory to another, but in fine examples will act as a lens that, as one moves the weight about, attractively varies the inner design's appearance. A magnifying glass is often used to gain appreciation of the fine detail of the work within. In a modern piece, an identifying mark and date are imperative.

Paperweights are made by individual artisans or in factories where many artists and technicians collaborate; both may produce inexpensive as well as "collector" weights.

Workmanship, design, rarity, and condition determine a paperweight's value: its glass should not have a yellow or greenish cast, and there should be no unintentional asymmetries, or unevenly spaced or broken elements. Visible flaws, such as bubbles, striations and scratches lessen the value.

Antique paperweights, of which perhaps 10,000 or so survive (mostly in museums), generally appreciate steadily in value; as of August 2018 the record price was the $258,500 paid in 1990 for an antique French weight.

=== History ===
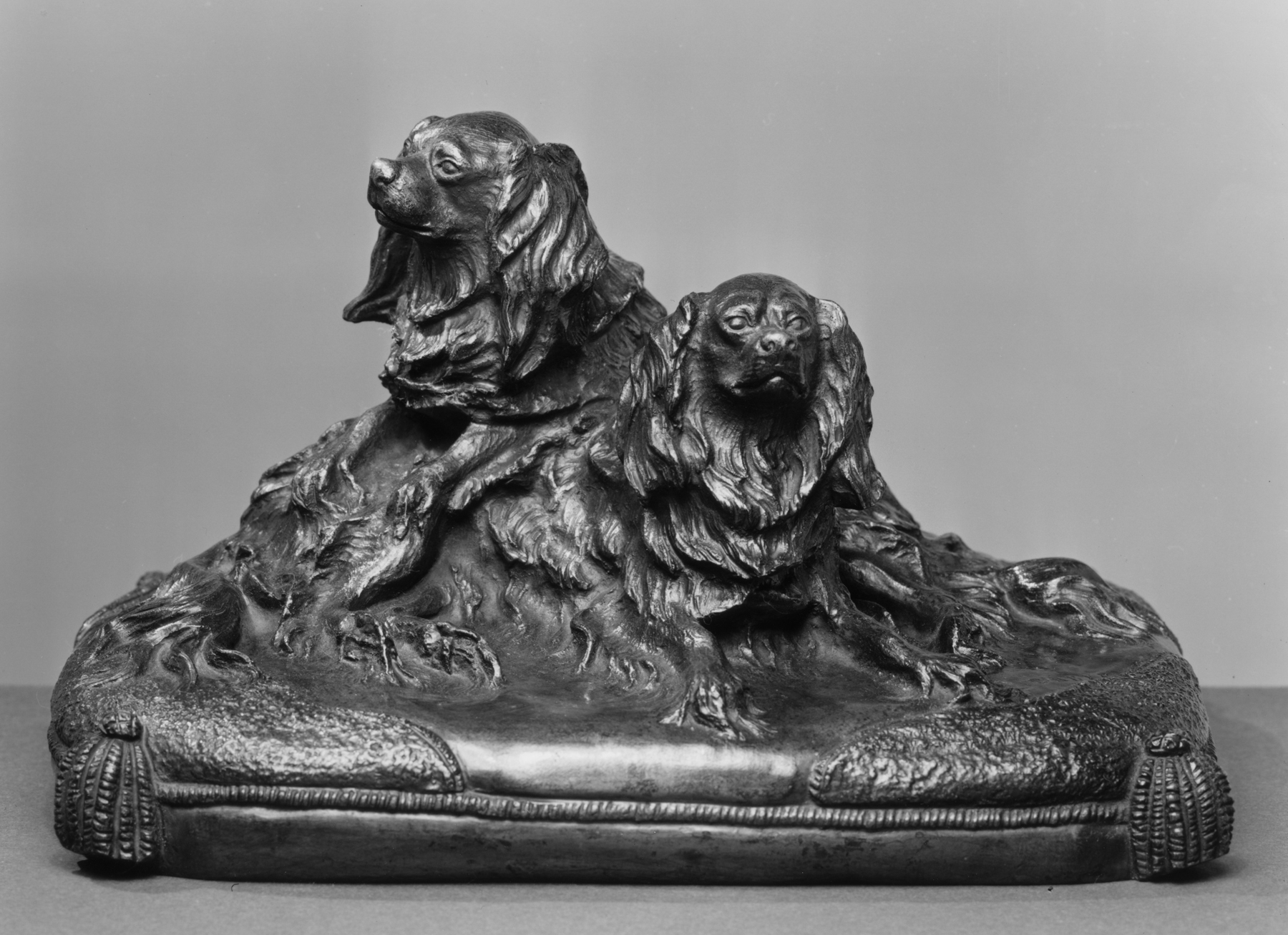
19th century metal paperweight by French sculptor Antoine-Louis Barye

In China, paperweights are as old as paper, having already existed in the Han dynasty (202-220 BC), and its predecessor, and were used for holding down floor mats in the Warring States period (475-221 BC).

Western paperweights started in the "classic" years between 1845 and 1860 primarily in three French factories named Baccarat, Saint-Louis and Clichy. Together, they made between 15,000 and 25,000 weights during this time. Weights (mainly of a lesser quality) were also made in the United States, United Kingdom, and elsewhere, though Bacchus (UK) and New England Glass Company (US) produced some that equaled the best of the French. Modern weights have been made from about 1950 to the present.

In the US, Charles Kaziun started to produce buttons, paperweights, inkwells and other bottles, using lamp-work of elegant simplicity in 1940. In Scotland, the pioneering work of Paul Ysart from the 1930s onward preceded a new generation of artists such as William Manson, Peter McDougall, Peter Holmes and John Deacons. A further impetus to reviving interest in paperweights was the publication of Evangiline Bergstrom's book, Old Glass Paperweights, the first of a new genre.

A number of small studios appeared in the mid-20th century, particularly in the US. These may have several to some dozens of workers with various levels of skill cooperating to produce their own distinctive line. Notable examples are Lundberg Studios, Orient and Flume, Correia Art Glass, St. Clair, Lotton, and Parabelle Glass.

Starting in the late 1960s and early 1970s, artists such as Francis Whittemore, Paul Stankard, his former assistant Jim D'Onofrio, Chris Buzzini, Delmo and daughter Debbie Tarsitano, Victor Trabucco and sons, Gordon Smith, Rick Ayotte and his daughter Melissa, the father and son team of Bob and Ray Banford, and Ken Rosenfeld began breaking new ground and were able to produce fine paperweights rivaling anything produced in the classic period.

=== Types of glass paperweights ===
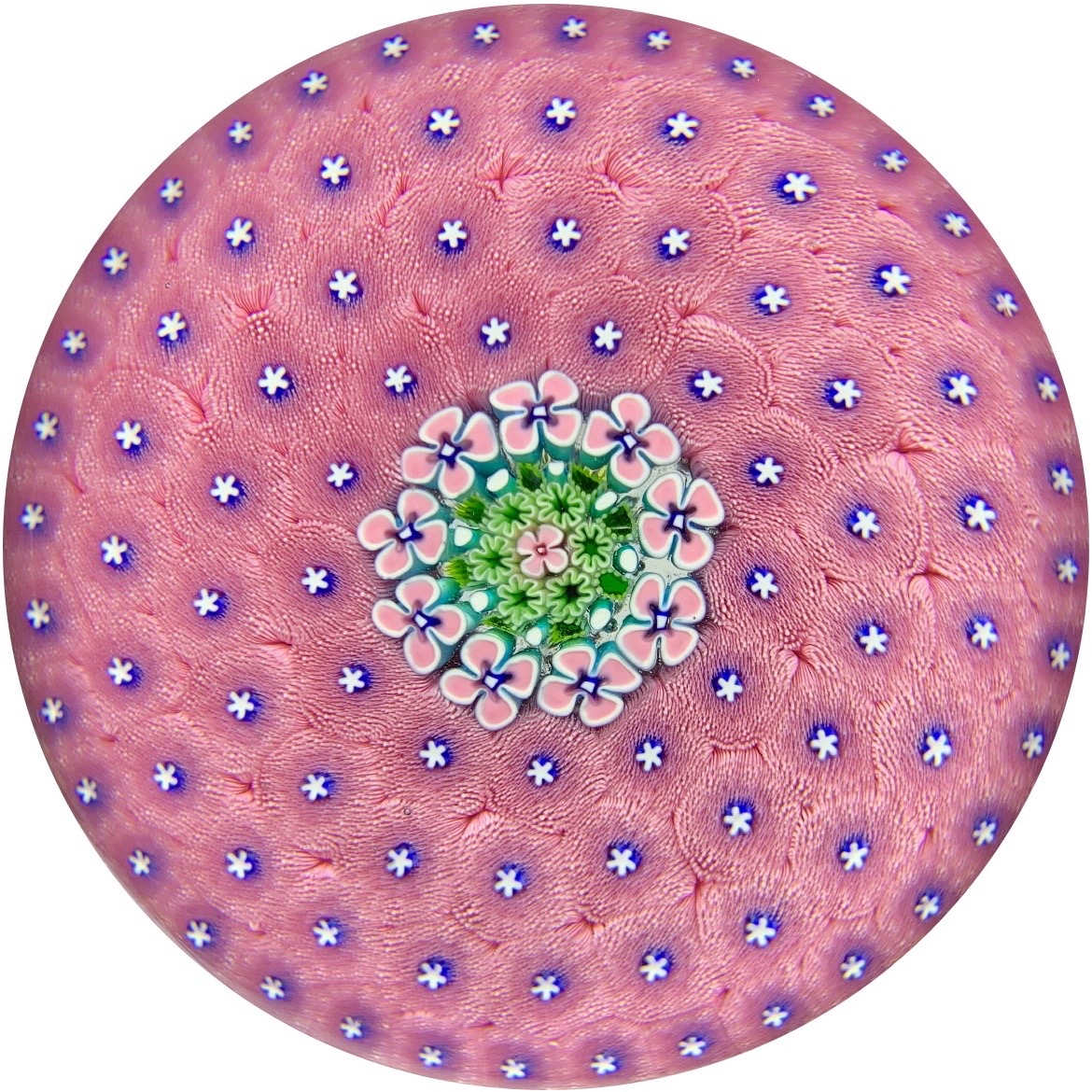
Damon MacNaught, 2018, Pink Millefiori Carpet Ground Paperweight

Collectors may specialize in one of several types of paperweights, but more often they wind up with an eclectic mix.

Millefiori (Italian—'thousand flowers') paperweights contain thin cross-sections of cylindrical composite canes made from colored rods and usually resemble little flowers, although they can be designed after anything, even letters and dates. These are usually made in a factory setting. They exist in many variations such as scattered, patterned, close concentric or carpet ground. Sometimes the canes are formed into a sort of upright tuft shaped like a mushroom that is encased in the dome. The year of manufacture is sometimes enclosed in one of the canes.

Lampwork paperweights have objects such as flowers, fruit, butterflies or animals constructed by shaping and working bits of colored glass with a gas burner or torch and assembling them into attractive compositions, which are then incorporated into the dome. This is a form particularly favored by studio artists. The objects are often stylized, but may be highly realistic.

Sulphide paperweights have an encased cameo-like medallion or portrait plaque made from a special ceramic that is able to reproduce very fine detail. These are known as incrustations, cameo incrustations, or sulphides. They often are produced to commemorate some person or event. From the late 1700s through the end of the 1900s, an amazing variety of glass objects, including paperweights, were made with incrustations. The finest collection of incrustations ever assembled was by Paul Jokelson, collector, author and founder of the Paperweight Collectors' Association. A part of his collection was gifted to the Corning Museum of Glass, with the remaining portion being sold in London in the 1990s.

Most paperweights, which are considered works of art, use one of the above techniques; millefiori, lampwork or sulphide — all techniques that had been around long before the advent of paperweights. A fourth technique, a crimp flower, usually a rose, originated in the Millville, New Jersey area in the first decade of the twentieth century. Often called a Millville rose, these weights range from simple folk art to fine works of art, depending on the maker.

Fine weights not made with any of the major techniques include swirls, marbries and crowns. Swirl paperweights have opaque rods of two or three colors radiating like a pinwheel from a central millefiori floret. A similar style, the marbrie, is a paperweight that has several bands of color close to the surface that descend from the apex in a looping pattern to the bottom of the weight. Crown paperweights have twisted ribbons, alternately colored and white filigree which radiate from a central millefiori floret at the top, down to converge again at the base. This was first devised in the Saint Louis factory and remains popular today.

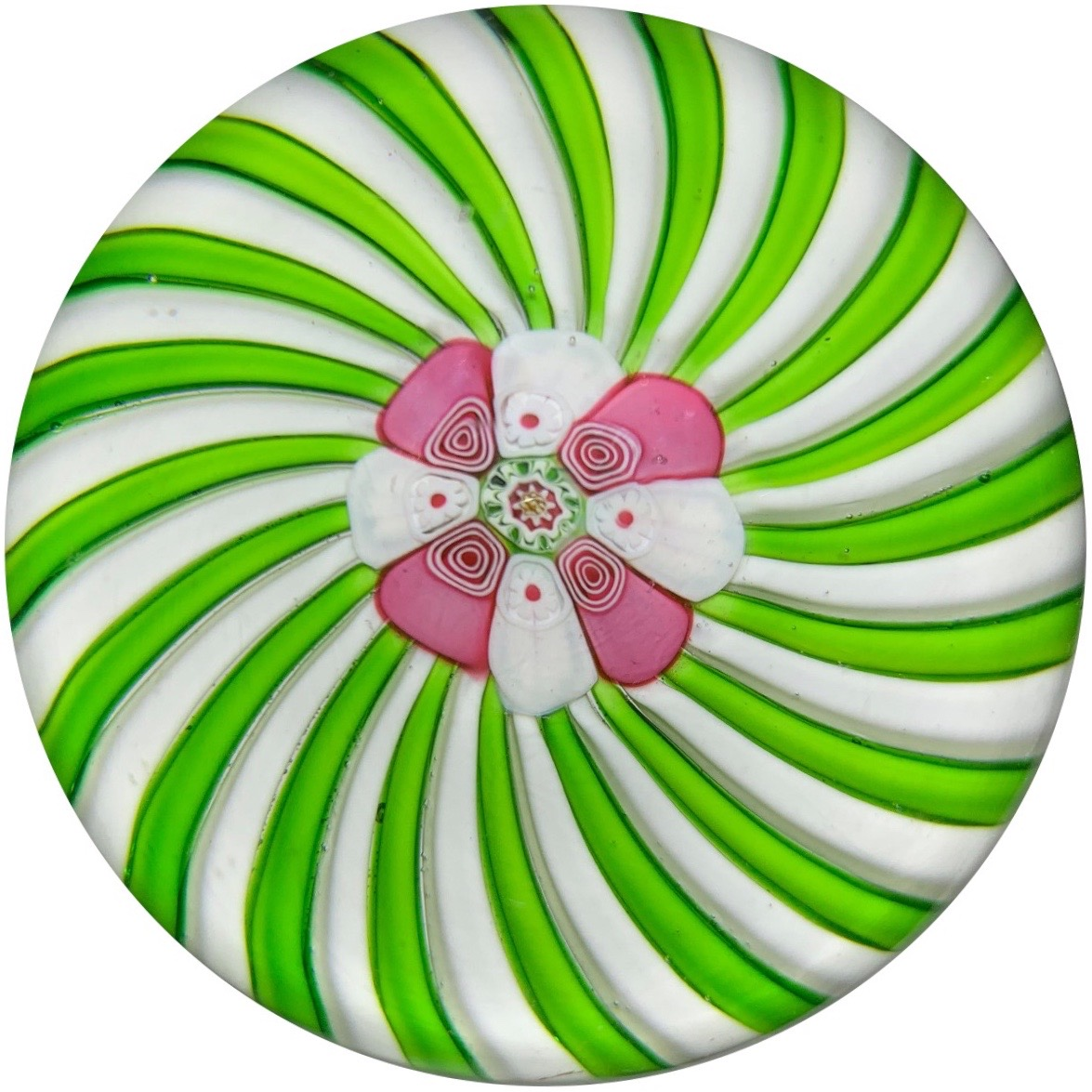
Antique Clichy Green & White Swirl Paperweight With Large Millefiori Center. Made in France in the Mid 1800s.

Miniature weights have a diameter of less than approximately 2 inches (5.1 cm), and magnums have a diameter greater than about 3.25 inches (8.3 cm).

California-style paperweights are made by "painting" the surface of the dome with colored molten glass (torchwork), and manipulated with picks or other tools. They may also be sprayed while hot with various metallic salts to achieve an iridescent look.

Victorian portrait and advertising paperweights were dome glass paperweights first made in Pittsburgh, Pennsylvania using a process patented in 1882 by William H. Maxwell. The portrait paperweights contained pictures of ordinary people reproduced on a milk glass disk and encased within clear glass. This same process was also used to produce paperweights with the owner's name encased or an advertisement of a business or product. Pittsburgher Albert A. Graeser patented a different process for making advertising paperweights in 1892. The Graeser process involved sealing an image to the underside of a rectangular glass blank using a milk glass or enamel-like glaze. Many paperweights of the late 19th century are marked either J. N. Abrams or Barnes and Abrams and may list either the 1882 Maxwell or 1892 Graeser patent date. It has been theorized that Barnes and Abrams did not actually manufacture advertising paperweights for their customers, but instead subcontracted the actual manufacturing task out to Pittsburgh-area glasshouses. The Paperweight Collectors Association Annual Bulletins published in 2000, 2001 and 2002 describe these in detail.

Bohemian paperweights were particularly popular in Victorian times. Large engraved or cut hollow spheres of ruby glass were a common form.

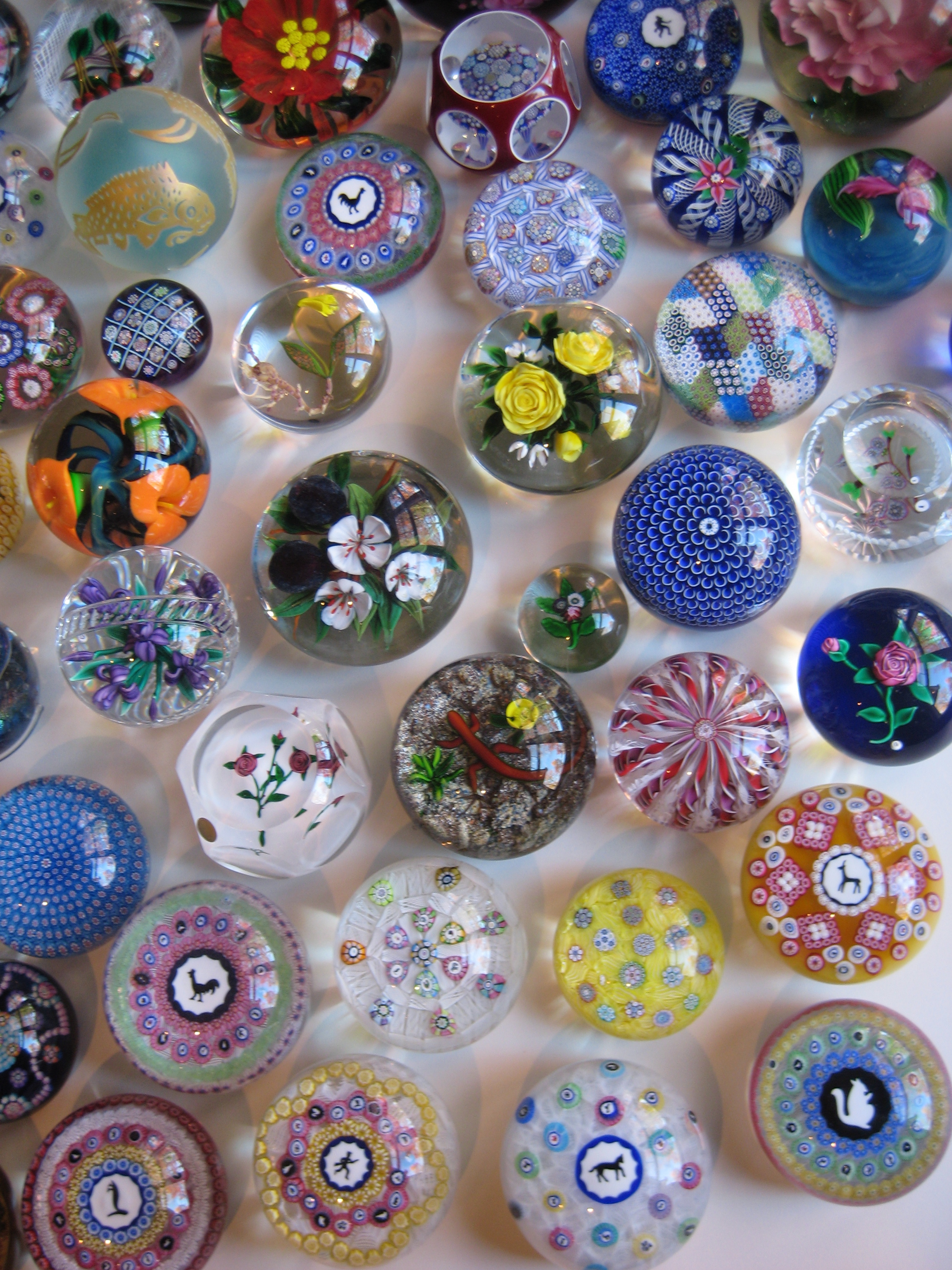
A paperweight collection

=== Museum collections ===
The United States has a number of museums exhibiting outstanding paperweight collections. Many collectors consider the finest of these to be the Arthur Rubloff collection at the Art Institute of Chicago, which expanded its exhibition in 2012. The Bergstrom-Mahler Museum in Neenah, Wisconsin, exhibits the Evangeline Bergstrom collection. The Corning Museum of Glass in Corning, New York, exhibits the Amory Houghton collection. The Yelverton Paperweight Centre in Devon, England, had a collection of over 1,000 paperweights, but closed in 2013.

Another museum with a notable exhibition of outstanding American paperweights is in the Museum of American Glass at the Wheaton Arts and Cultural Center in Millville, New Jersey. In 1998, Henry Melville Fuller donated 330 twentieth-century paperweights to the Currier Museum of Art in Manchester, New Hampshire.

=== Paperweight Collectors ===
There are many paperweight collectors worldwide. Several collectors' associations hold national or regional conventions, and sponsor activities such as tours, lectures, and auctions. Famous collectors include the literary figures Colette, Oscar Wilde and Truman Capote. Empress Eugenie (Napoleon III's wife), Empress Carlotta (wife of Maximilian I of Mexico) and Farouk, King of Egypt were also avid collectors. The collecting histories of Rubloff, Bergstrom, and Houghton were similar. They had two things in common—a passion for their collecting, and the privilege of having sufficient financial resources to build extensive collections of very rare and expensive weights. Another famous collector was Lothar-Günther Buchheim, the German author and painter, best known for his novel Das Boot. His collection of about 3,000 paperweights can be seen at his museum in Germany—Museum der Phantasie—in Bernried, Bavaria, Starnberger See.

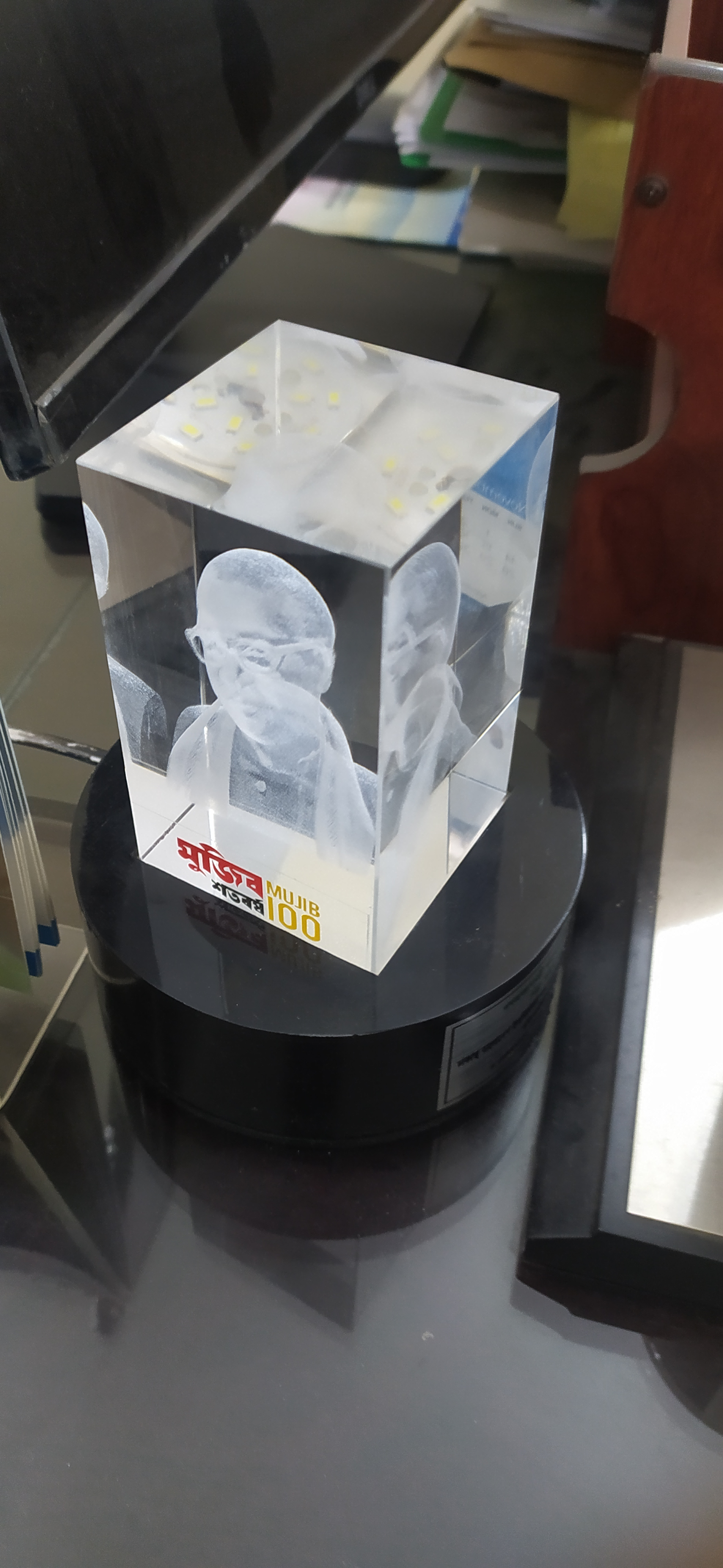
Memorabilia Paperweight for Mujib Year

In May 1953, collector Paul Jokelson organized and created the Paperweight Collectors Association (PCA), the world's first collecting group dedicated to glass paperweights. Interest grew rapidly and by May 1954, membership had risen to 280 members and the PCA published its first bulletin. The PCA held its first convention in May 1961, in New York City with 100 members in attendance. In September 1968, Paul Jokelson published the first PCA newsletter. In September 1995, the PCA entered the digital era, going online with the PCA, Inc. website. In December 2010 the PCA Facebook page was created, allowing for casual observers, aficionados, artists, and collectors to become connected.

PCA Members receive a newsletter four times a year and a printed annual bulletin. The annual bulletin is a source for all things paperweight-related. It contains research on paperweight makers of the 19th century. The PCA holds a convention biennially, where collectors, artists, dealers and scholars meet to share their passion for paperweights.

== See also ==
- Glass museums and galleries
- Snow globe
- Marble (toy)
