= Yelverton Paperweight Centre =

Museum in Devon, England

- Yelverton Paperweight Centre located within Dartmoor
- Established: 1978
- Dissolved: 2003
- Coordinates: 50°29′34″N 4°05′30″W
- Collection size: >1,200 paperweights
- Founder: Bernard Broughton

Yelverton Paperweight Centre was a paperweight museum and supplier in Leg O'Mutton, a small hamlet near Yelverton, in the English county of Devon. The museum began as the private collection of a Cornish postmaster, and grew to contain over 1,200 items. It was featured in the humorous travel book, More Bollocks to Alton Towers, which suggested that, "Even if you're sceptical when you arrive, you'll be amazed long before you leave".

As of 2015, the Paperweight Centre had closed and the building was up for sale.

== History ==
The museum began as the private collection of Bernard Broughton, the postmaster of St Tudy in Cornwall. Broughton's wife was bequeathed a French paperweight in a family member's will, and this inspired Broughton to begin collecting paperweights. When his personal collection had grown, he began to open it for public viewings in his post office building. In 1978, Broughton moved to Yelverton and continued giving the public access to his collection. At the point of his death in 1984, he had amassed 850 paperweights.

Between 1984 and 1997, the Paperweight Centre was managed by Kay Bolster, who had been assistant to Broughton since his move to Yelverton. During this time, the collection became a more popular tourist attraction. In 1997, the centre was taken over by David Hunter.

The centre closed some time after that.

== Collections ==
In total, the centre had approximately 1,200 paperweights; some from the Broughton collection, others acquired by its subsequent owners. The collection contained examples of paperweights from many different countries, including the United Kingdom, France, Italy and China. Some were from paperweight studios, such as Caithness Glass or Whitefriars Glass, while others were the work of individual artists. The centre also featured watercolour scenes of Dartmoor.

The centre was a dedicated commercial supplier of paperweights. Additionally, Bernard Broughton commissioned two series of paperweights, in a limited edition, from Isle of Wight Studio Glass. The first series in 1979 had a 'PO 79' embossed logo on the base. PO was a reference to Post Office. The second series had 'Y 1981' embossed on the base, a reference to Yelverton and the year they were made. The second series paperweights contain pieces of quartz collected from Bodmin Moor to add to the local interest.
