= King Edward VI Community College =

Location
- Ashburton Road; Totnes, Devon, TQ9 5JX; England; 50°26′17″N 3°41′46″W

Information
- Type: Academy
- Local authority: Devon County Council
- Trust: Education South West
- Department for Education URN: 149247 Tables
- Ofsted: Reports
- Principal: Alan Salt
- Gender: Coeducational
- Age: 11 to 18
- Enrolment: 947
- Website: https://www.kingedwardvi.org.uk

King Edward VI Community College (KEVICC) is a coeducational secondary school and sixth form located in Totnes, Devon, England. It is located in the Dart Valley on the A385 Ashburton Road and serves Totnes and the surrounding area. It has a large campus with around 940 students, 150 of whom are at the Kennicott Sixth Form centre adjoining the main site.

== History ==
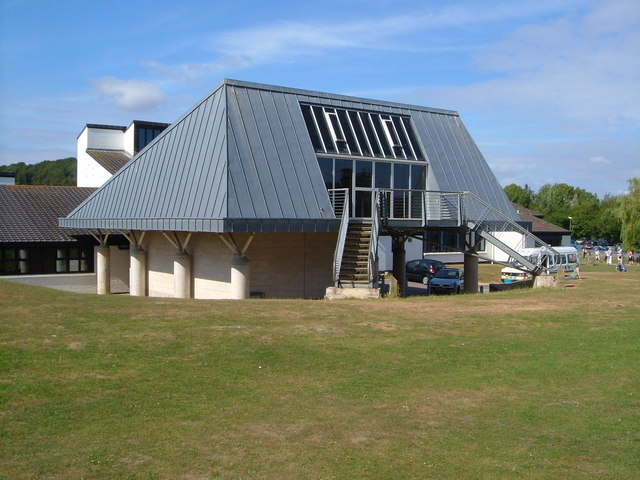
Ariel Centre

The school was founded in 1966 as the King Edward VI Comprehensive School, an amalgamation of the King Edward VI Grammar School for boys (founded 1553), the Redworth Secondary Modern School and the Totnes High School for Girls. The new school was located on the sites of the Redworth Secondary Modern and the neighbouring Totnes High School for Girls. The grammar school had been on a different site ("The Mansion" on Fore Street), which was too small to accommodate the new comprehensive school.

The school received its most recent Ofsted report in 2019, where it scored a 'Good'.

Previously a community school administered by Devon County Council, in September 2022 King Edward VI Community College converted to academy status. The school is now sponsored by Education South West.

== Curriculum ==
The school curriculum follows the National Curriculum of England and Wales and offers French and Spanish for a compulsory modern foreign language. Students choose 4 GCSE subjects, alongside Maths, English Language, English Literature, Science and Physical Education, which are all compulsory. Students also have the option of studying the English Baccalaureate (EBacc).

The school also has Kennicott sixth form for students to take A Levels, AS Levels, BTEC National Diplomas and EPQs.

== College houses ==
The school currently has four houses: Forest, River, Coast and Moor.

These took over from the previous four-school house system of Babbage, Davis, Gyles and Scott in 2024.

== Notable former teachers ==
- Thomas Peter Snape OBE (4 June 1925 - 30 April 1997), headmaster from 1964 to 1983; General Secretary from 1983 to 1988 of both the Secondary Heads Association and the Headmasters’ Conference.

== Notable former pupils ==
- Joanna Briscoe, novelist
- Jimmy Cauty, musician and artist
- Miracle Chance, stage actress and singer
- Helen J. Cooper, chemist and professor at the University of Birmingham
- Hester Goodman, musician; member of The Ukulele Orchestra of Great Britain
- Cathryn Harrison, actress
- Ben Howard, singer-songwriter
- Cosmo Jarvis (attended sixth form), singer-songwriter
- Warwick Lightfoot, Conservative politician
- Kieffer Moore, footballer
- Mary Nightingale, journalist and news presenter
- Guy Singh-Watson, organic farmer, Riverford Farm
- Ryan Stevenson, cricketer
- Sam and Sophie Tolchard, bowls players and 2014 Commonwealth Games medallists
- Toby Young, son of Lord Young of Dartington, journalist

Pupils of the Boys' Grammar school

- Charles Babbage, inventor of the computer
- Philip Furneaux, an English independent minister.
- Benjamin Kennicott, an English churchman and Hebrew scholar.
- Edward Lye, an 18th-century scholar of Old English and Germanic philology.
- George Jackson Churchward, Locomotive Superintendent of the Great Western Railway
- Gartrell Parker, a flying ace of the Second World War
