= Totnes =

Town in Devon, England

Coordinates: 50.432°N 3.684°W

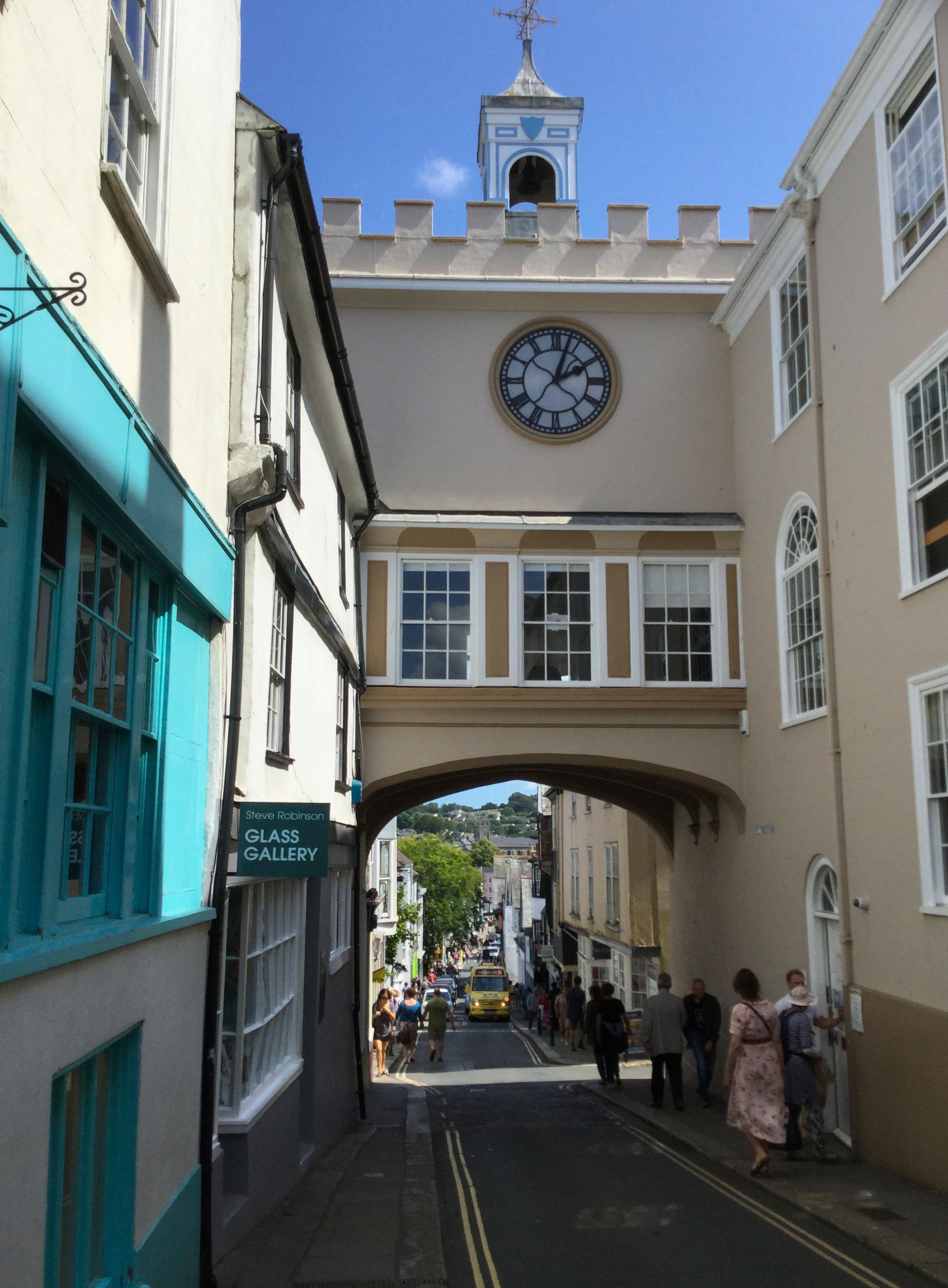
- The Eastgate over High Street in 2019

- Location within Devon
- Population: 8,241 (2021 census)
- OS grid reference: SX805605
- Civil parish: Totnes
- District: South Hams
- Shire county: Devon
- Region: South West
- Country: England
- Sovereign state: United Kingdom
- Post town: Totnes
- Postcode district: TQ9
- Dialling code: 01803
- Police: Devon and Cornwall
- Fire: Devon and Somerset
- Ambulance: South Western
- UK Parliament: South Devon

Totnes (/ˈtɒtnəs/ TOT-nuhss or /tɒtˈnɛs/ tot-NESS) is a market town and civil parish at the head of the estuary of the River Dart in Devon, England. It is about 5 miles (8 km) west of Paignton, about 7 miles (11 km) west-southwest of Torquay and about 20 miles (32 km) east-northeast of Plymouth, adjacent to the South Devon National Landscape. It is the administrative centre of the South Hams District Council. At the 2021 census, the parish had a population of 8,241.

Totnes has a long recorded history, dating back to 907, when its first castle was built. By the twelfth century it was already an important market town, and its former wealth and importance may be seen from the number of merchants' houses built in the sixteenth and seventeenth centuries. Today the town has a sizeable alternative and New Age community and is known as a place where one can live a bohemian lifestyle, though in recent times it has also gained a reputation as being a UK hotspot for conspiracy theorists.

== History ==
=== Totnes in myth and legend ===
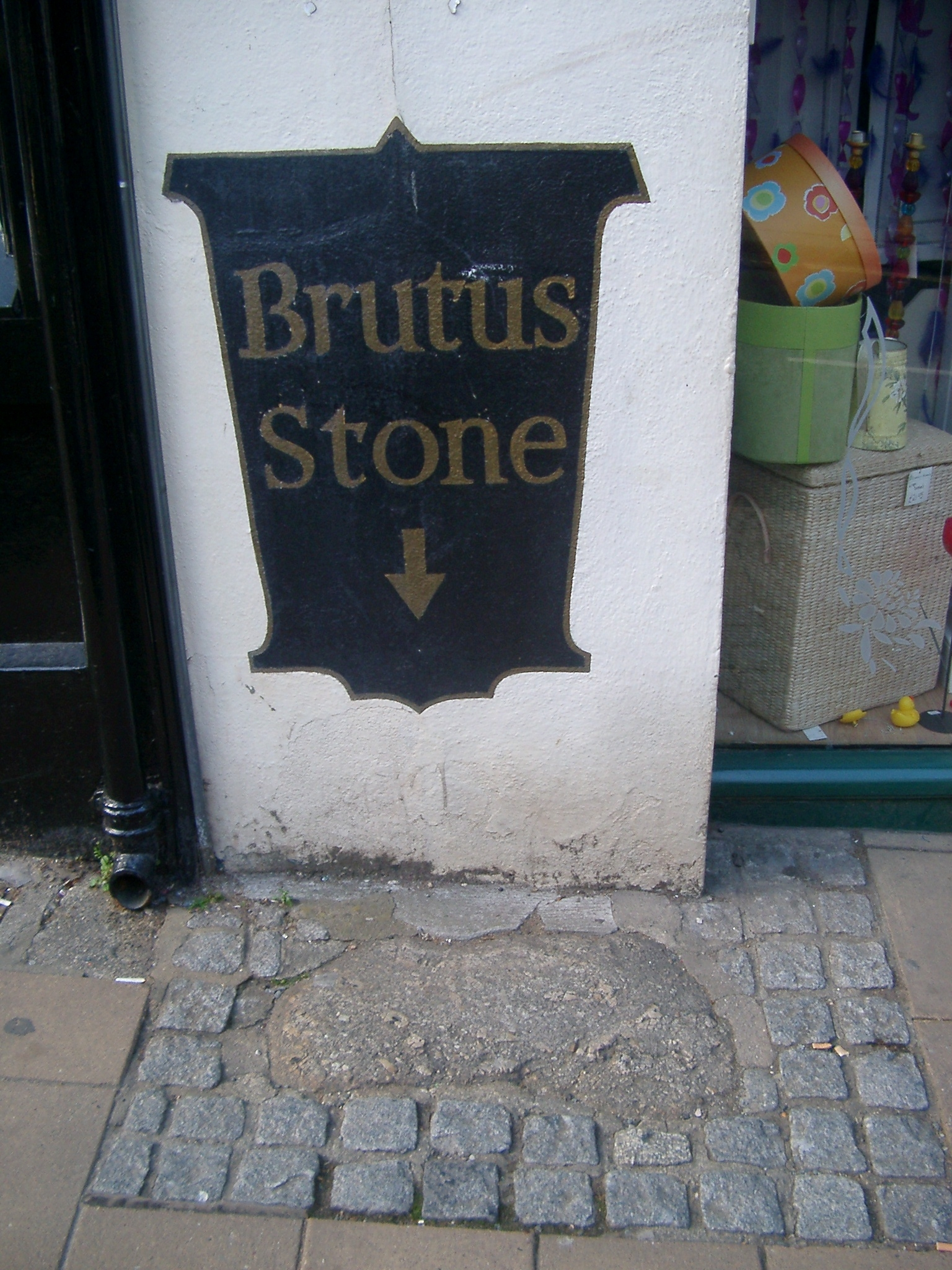
The Brutus Stone in Fore Street

According to the Historia Regum Britanniae written by Geoffrey of Monmouth in around 1136, "the coast of Totnes" was where Brutus of Troy, the mythical founder of Britain, first came ashore on the island. Set into the pavement of Fore Street is the Brutus Stone, a small granite boulder onto which, according to local legend, Brutus first stepped from his ship. As he did so he was supposed to have declaimed:

Here I stand and here I rest. And this town shall be called Totnes.

The stone is far above the highest tides and the tradition is not likely to be of great antiquity, being first mentioned in John Prince's Worthies of Devon in 1697. It is possible that the stone was originally the one from which the town crier, or bruiter, called out his news; or it may be le Brodestone, a boundary stone mentioned in several 15th-century disputes: its last-known position in 1471 was below the East Gate.

The Middle English prose Brut (c. 1419) places the fight between Brutus' general Corineus and the British giant Gogmagog "at Totttenes", while Cornish antiquary Richard Carew suggested that the fight may have begun near the town, but ended at Plymouth Hoe. The Historia has several other landings at the Totness coast: the Roman general Vespasian, Constantine of Brittany at the port of Totnes, Aurelius Ambrosius and his brother Uther Pendragon attempting to win back the throne of Britain from the usurper Vortigern, the Saxons at war with King Arthur, and in one version Cadwallo fighting against the Mercians. The Historia also mentions the town in a prophecy of Merlin: "after [the dragon of Worcester] shall succeed the boar of Totness, and oppress the people with grievous tyranny. Gloucester shall send forth a lion, and shall disturb him in his cruelty, in several battles. He shall trample him under his feet, and terrify him with open jaws."

=== Ancient and medieval history ===
The first authentic history of Totnes is in AD 907, when it was fortified by King Edward the Elder as part of the defensive ring of burhs built around Devon, replacing one built a few years earlier at nearby Halwell. The site was chosen because it was on an ancient trackway which forded the river at low tide. Between the reigns of Edgar and William II (959–1100) Totnes intermittently minted coins. Some time between the Norman Conquest in 1066 and the compilation of Domesday Book in 1086 William the Conqueror granted the burh to Juhel of Totnes, who was probably responsible for the construction of the original castle. Juhel did not retain his lordship for long, however, as he was deprived of his lands in 1088 or 1089 for rebelling against William II.

The name Totnes (first recorded in AD 979) comes from the Old English personal name Totta and ness, or headland. Before reclamation and development the low-lying areas around this hill were largely marsh or tidal wetland, giving the hill much more the appearance of a "ness" than today.

By the 12th century Totnes was already an important market town owing to its position on one of the main roads of the South West, in conjunction with its easy access to its hinterland and the easy navigation of the River Dart.

=== Modern history ===
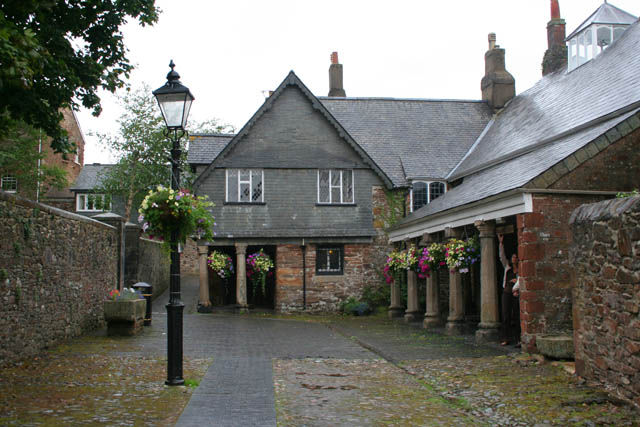
Totnes Guildhall

By 1523, according to a tax assessment, Totnes was the second-richest town in Devon, and the sixteenth richest in England, ahead of Worcester, Gloucester and Lincoln. In 1553, King Edward VI granted Totnes a charter allowing a former Benedictine priory building that had been founded in 1088 to be used as Totnes Guildhall and a school. In 1624, the Guildhall was converted to be a magistrates' court. Soldiers were billeted here during the English Civil War and Oliver Cromwell visited for discussions with the general and parliamentary commander-in-chief Thomas Fairfax, 3rd Lord Fairfax of Cameron in 1646.

The population in the 1841 census was 3,849.

Until 1887, the Guildhall was also used as the town prison with the addition of prison cells. It remained a magistrates' court until 1974. In 1990, a serious fire broke out on the High Street, resulting in the historic Eastgate structure being destroyed and an estimated £10 million in damage.

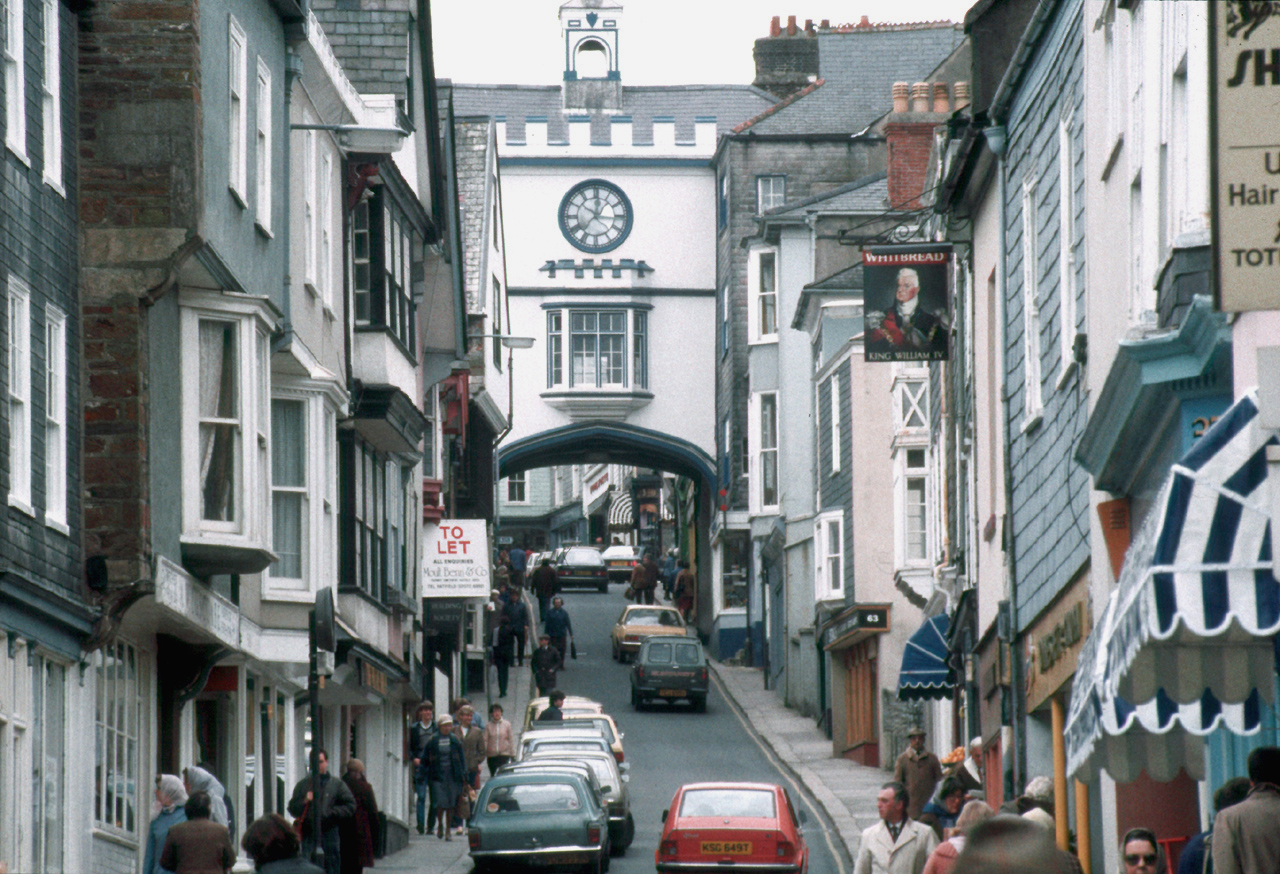
Eastgate in 1983, before the 1990 fire.

In 2006 Totnes become the first transition town of the transition initiative. Permaculture designer Rob Hopkins developed this idea with his students and later with Naresh Giangrande developed the transition model in his home town of Totnes, which has since featured in many articles and films showing this concept. Totnes has adopted an Energy Descent Plan, as a response in answer to the twin problems of greenhouse gas emissions and peak oil. As a result of a series of public gatherings with experts, and the organisation of a number of special interest groups, the community has come together with lecturers and trainers shared with Schumacher College, through a process of participative strategic planning, to hone their skills in project development. As a result of the initiatives in Totnes, a large number of other communities have started "Transition Town" projects, and there are now more than 400 around the world, ranging from small communities to whole cities (e.g. Berlin). Totnes hosts the Sea Change Festival that has been running in the town and neighbouring Dartington since 2016.

== Governance ==
Totnes' borough charter was granted by King John, probably around 1206; at any rate, the 800th anniversary of the charter was celebrated in 2006, although Totnes lost its borough status in local government reorganisation in 1974. Totnes was served by Totnes electoral borough from 1295 until the Reform Act 1867, but was restored by the Representation of the People Act 1884. The constituency of Totnes was abolished a second time in 1983, and formed part of the South Hams constituency until 1997, when it was restored as the Totnes county constituency: as such it returns one member of parliament (MP) to Parliament.

In August 2009, Totnes became the first constituency to select the Conservative's prospective parliamentary candidate through an open primary that was organised by the local Conservative Association. Dr Sarah Wollaston won the Totnes primary in August 2009, and went on to be elected to Parliament at the 2010 general election. In 2019, she moved to Change UK, and then to the Liberal Democrats, for whom she contested Totnes in the 2019 general election, coming second when the seat reverted to the Conservatives. In 2024 after a tactical voting primary the Liberal Democrats won the seat and Caroline Voaden became the MP.

Totnes has been represented by the Greens on Devon County Council since 2009.

Totnes has a mayor who is elected by the sixteen town councillors each year. Follaton House, on the outskirts of the town, is the headquarters of the South Hams District Council. The town is twinned with the French town of Vire, after which Vire Island on the River Dart near the "Plains" is named. There is also a longstanding local joke that Totnes is twinned with the fantasy land of Narnia.

== Geography ==
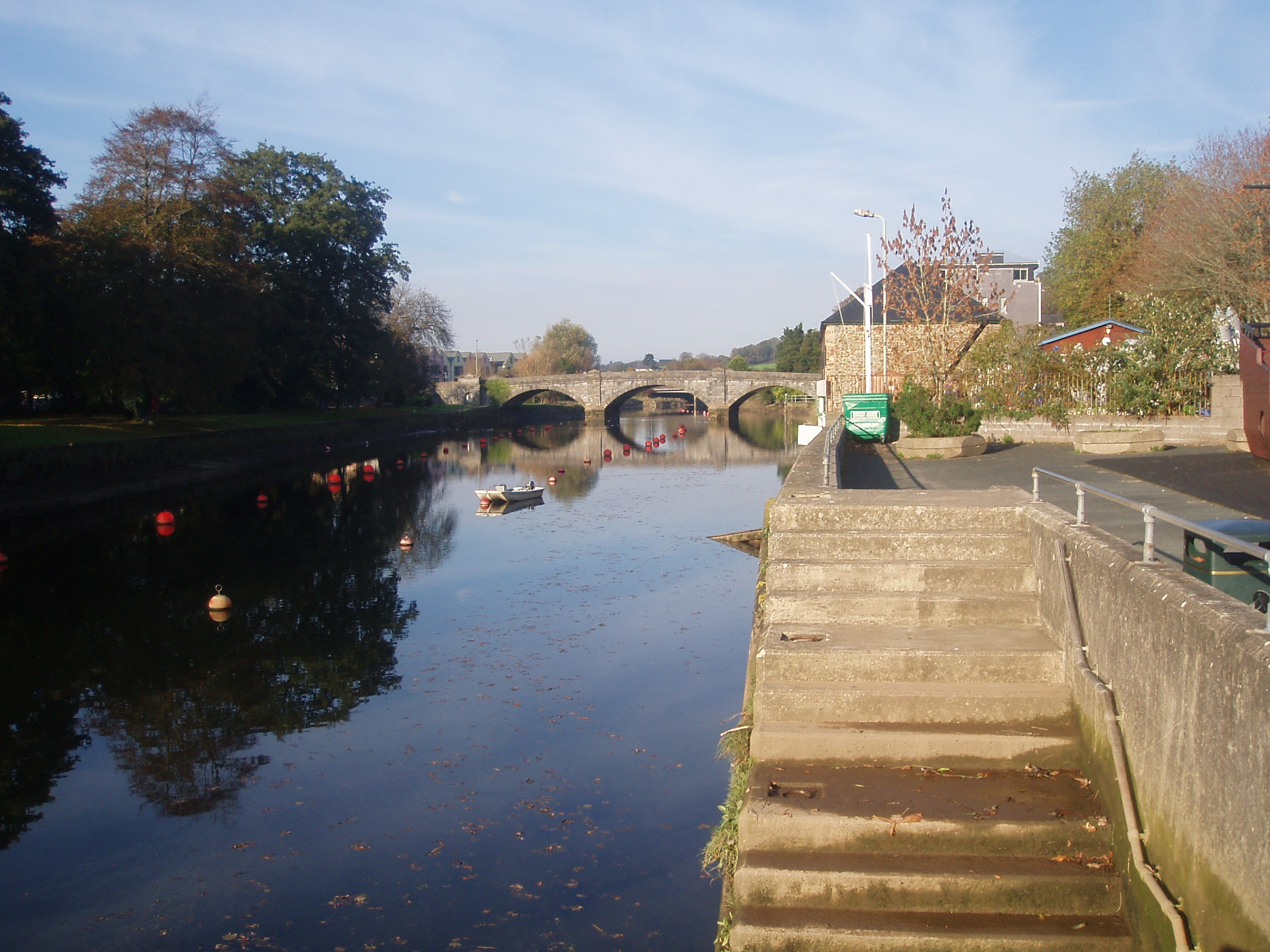
The River Dart at Totnes

The town is built on a hill rising from the west bank of the River Dart, which separates Totnes from the suburb of Bridgetown. It is at the lowest bridging point of the river, which here is tidal and forms a winding estuary down to the sea at Dartmouth. The river continues to be tidal for about 1 mile (1.6 km) above the town until it meets Totnes Weir, built in the 17th century. The town is a gateway to the South Devon National Landscape, a designated area of outstanding natural beauty that covers much of the south Devon coast, including the Dart estuary.

Today there are two road bridges, a railway bridge and a footbridge over the river in the town. Totnes Bridge, the nearest to the sea, is a road bridge built in 1826–28 by Charles Fowler. At low tide the foundations of the previous stone bridge are visible just upstream—it was probably built in the early 13th century and widened in 1692. Before the first stone bridge was built there was almost certainly a wooden bridge here, and there was a tidal ford for heavy vehicles just downstream. In 1982 a new concrete bridge was built about 1,000 feet (300 m) upstream as part of the Totnes inner relief road. Its name, Brutus Bridge, was chosen by the local residents. A further 0.5 miles (0.80 km) upstream, the railway bridge carries the National Rail Exeter to Plymouth line over the river. Immediately upstream of the railway bridge is a footbridge, built in 1993 to provide access to the Totnes (Riverside) terminus of the South Devon Railway.

== Economy ==
Totnes has attracted a sizeable "alternative" community, and the town is known as a place where one can live a "New Age" lifestyle. There are a number of facilities for artists, painters and musicians, and there is a twice-weekly market offering antiques, musical instruments, second-hand books, handmade clothing from across the world, and local organically produced products. In 2007, Time magazine declared Totnes the capital of new age chic. In 2005, Highlife, the British Airways magazine, declared it one of the world's Top 10 Funky Towns.

In March 2007 Totnes was the first town in Britain to introduce its own local alternative currency, the Totnes pound, to support the local economy of the town. Fourteen months later, 70 businesses within the town were trading in the "Totnes Pound," accepting them as payment and offering them to shoppers as change from their purchases. The initiative was part of the transition town concept, which was pioneered by Rob Hopkins, who had recently moved to Totnes. The Totnes pound was discontinued in 2019.

Emphasising the town's continuing history of boatbuilding, between 1998 and 2001 Pete Goss built his revolutionary but ill-fated 120-foot Team Philips catamaran there, which had to be abandoned mid-Atlantic when it started to break up.

Loss of revenue from Dartington College of Arts, which moved to Falmouth in 2010, was partially offset by increased tourism due to interest in Totnes's status as a transition town.

== Demographics ==
At the 2021 census, Totnes civil parish had a population of 8,241. The Office for National Statistics also define a Totnes Built-up Area which includes the outer areas of Bridgetown which are in Berry Pomeroy parish and the areas of Puddavine and Copland Meadows which are in Dartington parish; the total population of this area was 9,215 in 2021.

Census population of Totnes parish
Census	Population	Female	Male	Households	Source
2001	7,444	3,996	3,448	3,444	
2011	7,456	3,980	3,476	3,563	
2021	8,241	4,453	3,788	3,981	

== Landmarks ==
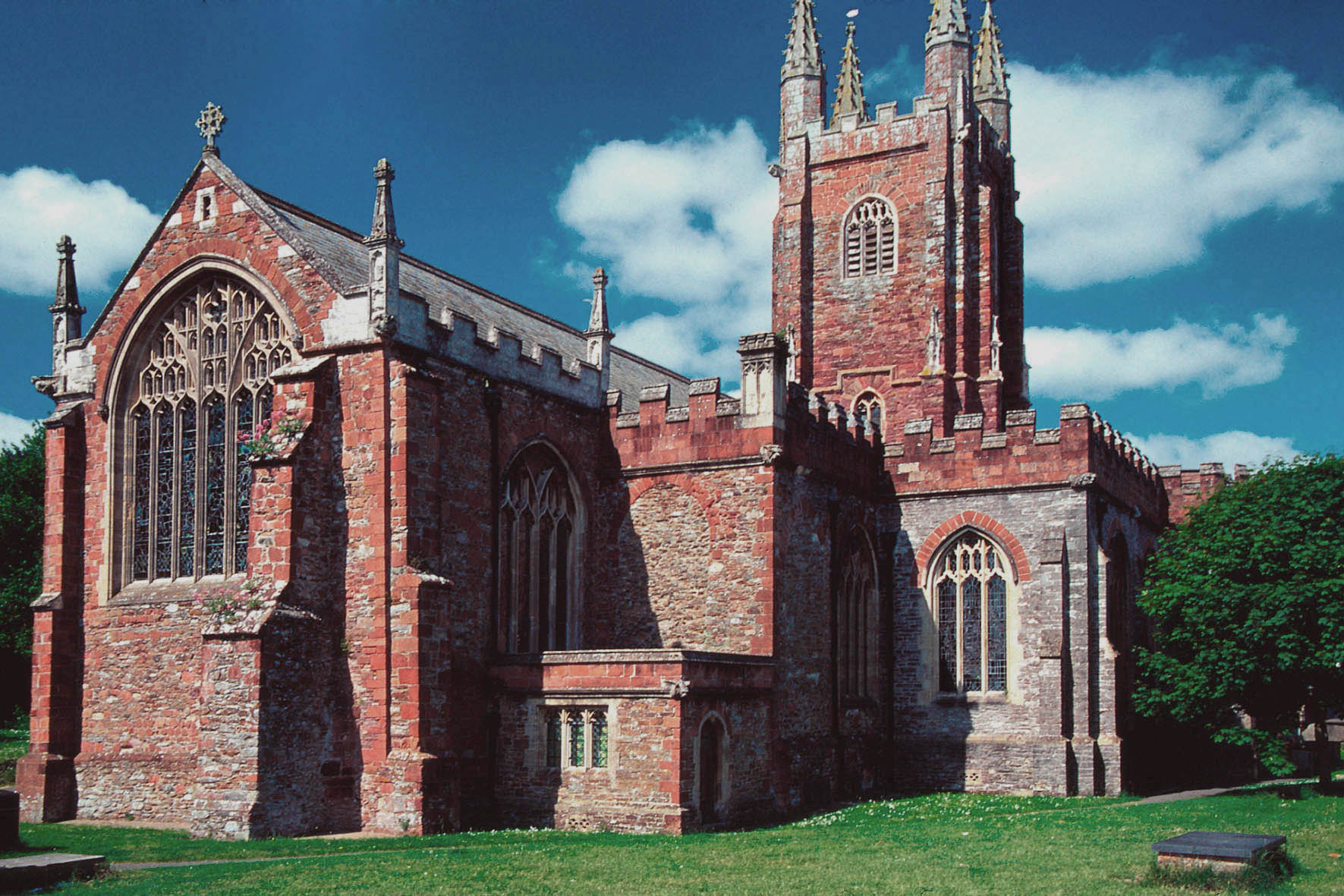
St Mary's Church

Totnes is said to have more listed buildings per head than any other town.

The Norman motte-and-bailey Totnes Castle, now owned by English Heritage, was built during the reign of William I, probably by Juhel of Totnes. The late medieval church of St Mary with its 120-foot-high (37 m) west tower, visible from afar, is built of rich red Devonian sandstone. A prominent feature of the town is the Eastgate—an arch spanning the middle of the main street. This Elizabethan entrance to the walled town was destroyed in a fire in September 1990, but was rebuilt.

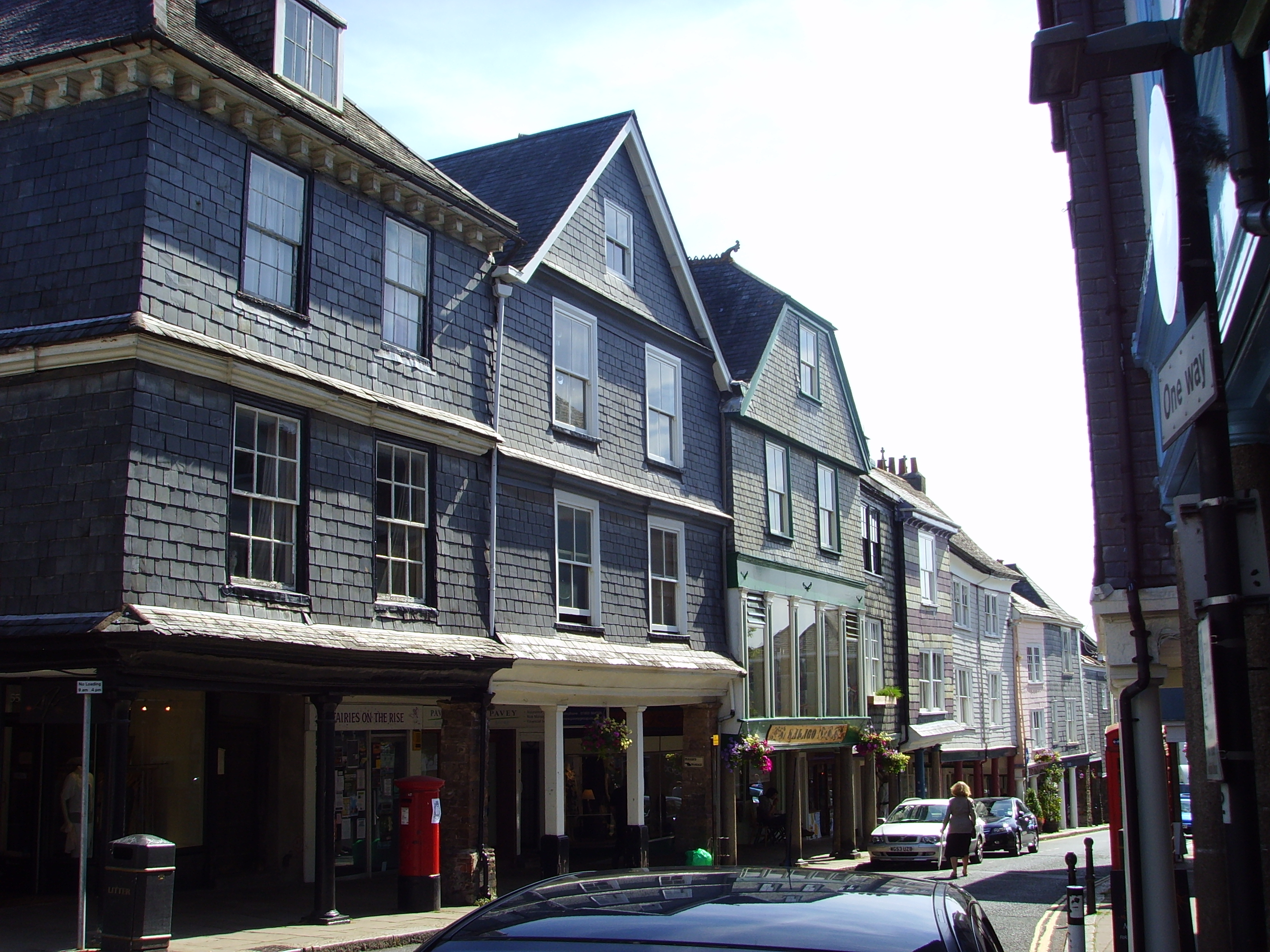
The Butterwalk

The ancient Leechwell, so named because of the supposed medicinal properties of its water, and apparently where lepers once came to wash, still provides fresh water. The Butterwalk is a Tudor covered walkway that was built to protect the dairy products once sold here from the sun and rain. Totnes Elizabethan House Museum is in one of the many authentic Elizabethan merchants' houses in the town, built around 1575.

== Transport ==
The A38 road passes about 7 miles (11 km) to the west of Totnes, connected to the town by the A384 from Buckfastleigh and the A385 which continues to Paignton. The town also lies on the A381 between Newton Abbot and Salcombe.

Totnes railway station is on the Exeter-to-Plymouth line and has trains direct to London Paddington, Plymouth and Penzance, and as far north as Aberdeen.

Nearby, Totnes (Riverside) railway station is at the southern end of the South Devon Railway Trust which runs tourist steam locomotives along the line that follows the River Dart up to Buckfastleigh.

Bus services are provided by Stagecoach South West, Tally Ho Coaches and County Bus. Totnes also has a town minibus service provided by Bob The Bus. Lomax Tours run coach trips from Totnes.

Since the River Dart is navigable to seagoing boats as far as Totnes, the estuary was used for the import and export of goods from the town until 1995.

== Education ==
King Edward VI Community College, more popularly known as KEVICC, is the local secondary school which shares its name with the former grammar school set up by King Edward VI over 450 years ago. At the western edge of the town is the Dartington Hall Estate, which formerly included the Schumacher College and the Dartington College of Arts until their closures in September 2024 and July 2010, respectively. There are also a number of alternative private schools in the Totnes area, providing primary and secondary education.

== Media ==
Local TV coverage is provided by BBC South West and ITV West Country. Television signals are received from the nearby Beacon Hill TV transmitter and the local relay transmitter.

Local radio stations are BBC Radio Devon on 104.3 FM, Radio Exe Devon on DAB, Heart West on 100.5 FM, Greatest Hits Radio Devon on 105.5 FM and Soundart Radio, a community based station which broadcast on 102.5 FM and online through Radioplayer.

Totnes Times
- Type: Local newspaper
- Headquarters: Totnes, South Hams, Devon
- City: Totnes
- Country: England

The Totnes Times is a local newspaper serving the town and the surrounding South Hams area in Devon. It is owned by Tindle Newspapers. Published weekly, it appears on Thursdays. Its first issue dated 7 April 1860 was under the title of The Totnes Weekly Times. There have been several title changes over the years. In the 1931 edition of Willing's Press Guide it is listed as the Totnes Times and Devon News. A microfiche archive of the newspaper is held at Totnes Archive on the Totnes Museum site.

== Notable people ==
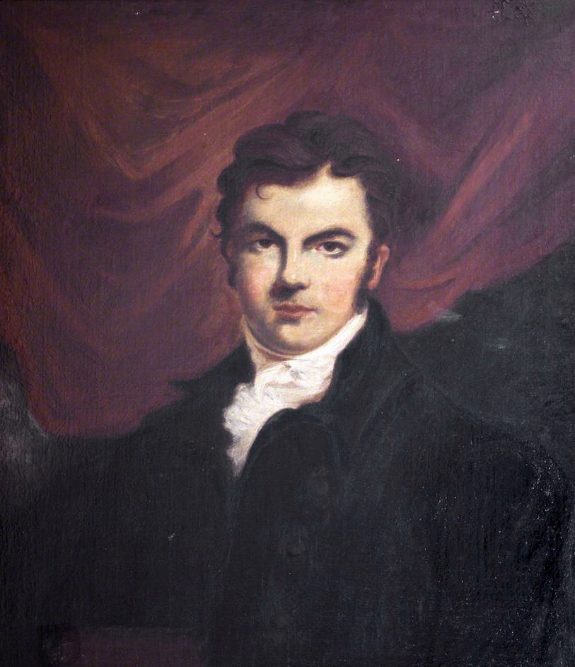
William Brockedon, 19th C.

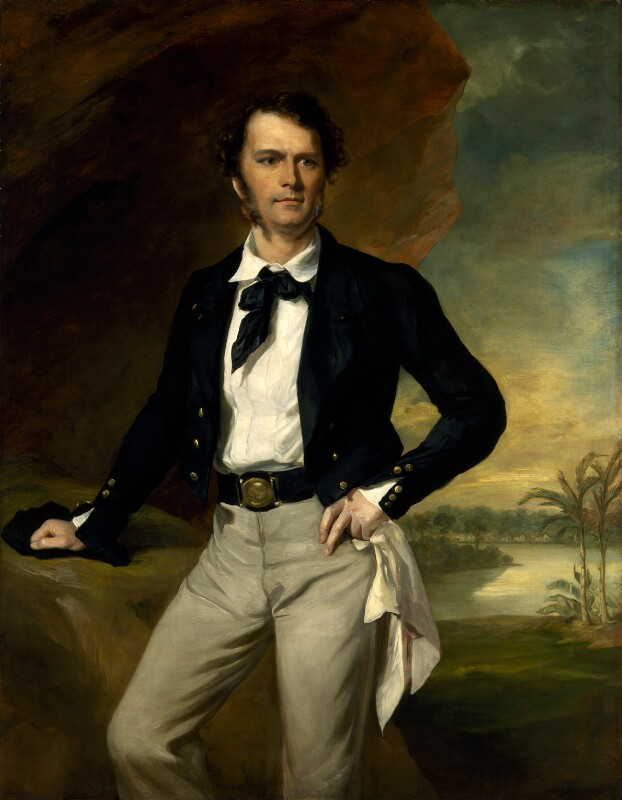
James Brooke, 1847

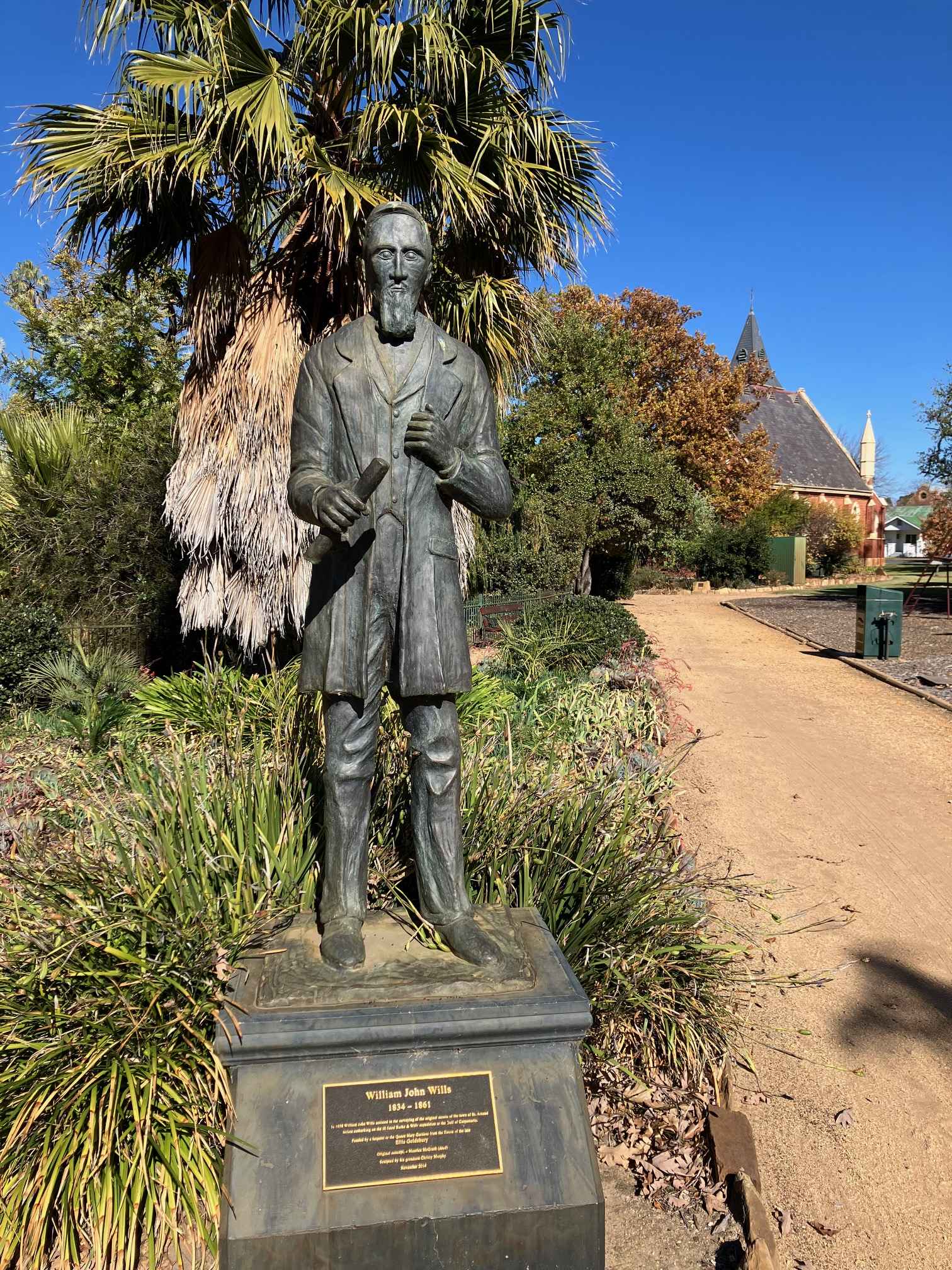
Statue of William John Wills in the Botanic Gardens, St Arnaud, Victoria

- Sir Oliver St John (c.1598–1673), barrister, judge, politician and local MP, 1640-1653.
- Richard Burthogge (1637/38–1705), physician, magistrate and philosopher.
- Rev. John Prince (1643–1723), vicar of Totnes in the late 17th C., wrote Worthies of Devon.
- John Huxham (1692–1768), physician, studied fevers.
- Edward Lye (1694–1767), linguist, wrote the first dictionary of Anglo-Saxon, born in Totnes.
- William Stumbels (1700 to 1769), clockmaker, two of which are in Totnes Museum.
- Benjamin Kennicott (1718–1783), Hebrew scholar.
- Sir William Elford, 1st Baronet (1749–1837), Recorder of the borough and artist.
- William Reeve (1757–1815), composer, musician, actor and local organist, 1781-1783
- John Venning (1776–1858), merchant and philanthropist, interested in prison reform in Russia.
- Walter Venning (1781–1821), merchant and philanthropist, interested in prison reform.
- William Brockedon (1787–1854), artist and inventor, son of Philip Brockedon, clockmaker.
- Vice-Admiral Sir Frederick Thomas Michell (1788–1873), mayor of Totnes 1855 to 1858.
- Charles Babbage 1791–1871), polymath, mathematician, philosopher, inventor and mechanical engineer. went to local school.
- Sir James Brooke (1803–1868), soldier and adventurer, founded the Rajah of Sarawak, lived and died in nearby Burrator.
- Hurrell Froude (1803–1836), an Anglican priest and an early leader of the Oxford Movement.
- James Anthony Froude (1818 – 20 October 1894), historian and author.
- William John Wills (1834–c.1861), explorer, co-lead the Burke and Wills expedition.
- Seán O'Casey (1880–1964), playwright, lived in the town, 1938-1954.
- Mary Wesley (1912–2002), novellist and author of The Camomile Lawn, spent her final years in Totnes.
- Pegaret Anthony (1915–2000), World War II artist
- Bruce Montgomery (1921–1978), crime writer and film-score composer (penname Edmund Crispin) lived in Totnes in the 1950s–60s.
- Desmond Bagley (1923–1983), journalist and novelist, lived locally 1966-1976.
- Christopher Titmuss (born 1944), Insight Meditation instructor, author of books on Dharma (Buddhism), lived locally since 1983.
- Marcia Willett (1945-2022), novelist, lived locally, many of her books are set in Devon.
- John Lancaster (born 1946), poet and writer lives locally.
- Mike Edwards (1948–2010), cellist with the Electric Light Orchestra, 1972-1975, later lived locally
- Rik Mayall (1958–2014), a comedian, actor and writer; lived, died and was buried locally.
- George Monbiot (born 1963), writer and activist, journalist with The Guardian, lives in Totnes.
- Rob Hopkins (born 1968), founder of the Transition town movement.
- Sophie Dix (born 1969), actress, born in Totnes.
- Jock, (born 1972), Dom Reardon & Lee O'Connor (born 1982) comic-book artists lived and worked locally.
- Emrhys Cooper (born 1985), actor and dancer grew up in Totnes.
- Ben Howard (born 1987), folk singer-songwriter, brought up and lives in Totnes.
- Cosmo Jarvis (born 1989 or 1990) singer-songwriter and filmmaker, raised in Totnes.

== Arms ==
Coat of arms of Totnes
Notes Recorded in this form at the Visitation of 1572, for the Borough of Totnes. Transferred by Order in Council 16 April 1975. Escutcheon Sable upon Water in base Azure and between two Keys wards upward and outward a triple towered Castle the Portcullis raised and upon each outer tower a Banner all Argent.

== See also ==
- Totnes Museum
- Totnes Costume Museum
- Totnes Community Hospital
