= Bideford Bay =

Bay in Devon, England

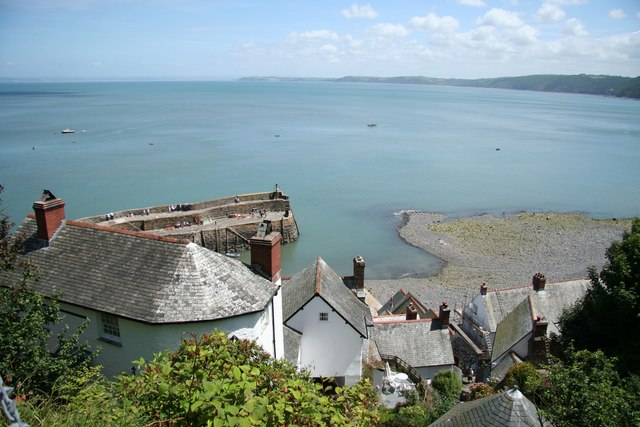
- View over Bideford Bay, looking north-eastwards from Clovelly towards Baggy Point

- Location within Devon
- Coordinates: 51°04′N 4°20′W

Bideford Bay, also known as Barnstaple Bay and often shown on maps as Barnstaple or Bideford Bay, is a large area of water on the northwest coast of Devon in South West England, at the southwestern end of the Bristol Channel where it joins the Celtic Sea. The bay extends from Hartland Point in the southwest to Baggy point the northeast, and is partly sheltered by the island of Lundy, 12 miles (19 km) offshore. It takes its alternative names from the towns of Bideford and Barnstaple, located respectively on the rivers Torridge and Taw which flow into the bay.

== Topography and geology ==
The north-facing coastline east of Hartland Point is backed by steep wooded or rocky cliffs with no natural harbours; this section is sparsely populated. The small former fishing village of Clovelly is a popular tourist destination, with a man-made harbour. Further east is the village of Westward Ho!, where there is a clearly defined raised beach platform, cut well above the level of the present beach by wave action at times of high sea levels. There is a submerged forest with peat deposits at the southern end of Westward Ho! Beach, providing evidence of sea level rise which swamped the coastal forest about 6,000 years ago.

North of Westward Ho! the coastline changes to one of extensive sandy beaches backed by sand dune systems. The combined estuary of the rivers Taw and Torridge emerges into the bay between the dune systems of Northam Burrows and Braunton Burrows. The Northam Burrows area is managed as a country park, and comprises a grassy coastal plain with a shingle ridge and spit formed by a process of longshore drift. Braunton Burrows is one of the largest sand dune systems in Britain, at over 3 miles (5 km) long and 1 mile (2 km) wide, and backs the long wide sandy beach of Saunton Sands. The dunes are of international importance for their wildlife, including a number of rarities, and form the core of a Biosphere Reserve.

The northern section of the bay's coast comprises the popular surfing and tourist venues of Croyde Bay and Morte Bay (including Woolacombe), smaller bays with beaches set between the steeply sloping headlands of Saunton Down, Baggy Point and Morte Point. The coastline between Saunton Sands and Baggy Point includes cliffs rising in places to 200 feet (61 m), comprising Devonian sandstones, shales, slates and limestones, many of which show dramatic folding. Raised beaches hold large erratic boulders transported to the area by glaciation, including a 12 tonne pink granite boulder at Saunton thought to have originated in north west Scotland.

== Designations and amenities ==
The coastal landscape of the bay forms the core of the North Devon AONB - a designation which also includes sections of the Devon coast to the east and west. In addition the larger part of this coast has also been designated as a part of the North Devon and Hartland Heritage Coasts.

The popular national trail, the South West Coast Path, runs the entire length of the bay. There are car parks for visitors at Croyde, Saunton, Braunton Burrows, Northam Burrows, Westward Ho! and Clovelly.
