= Pickwell, Devon =

Coordinates: 51.1469°N 4.2067°W

Pickwell
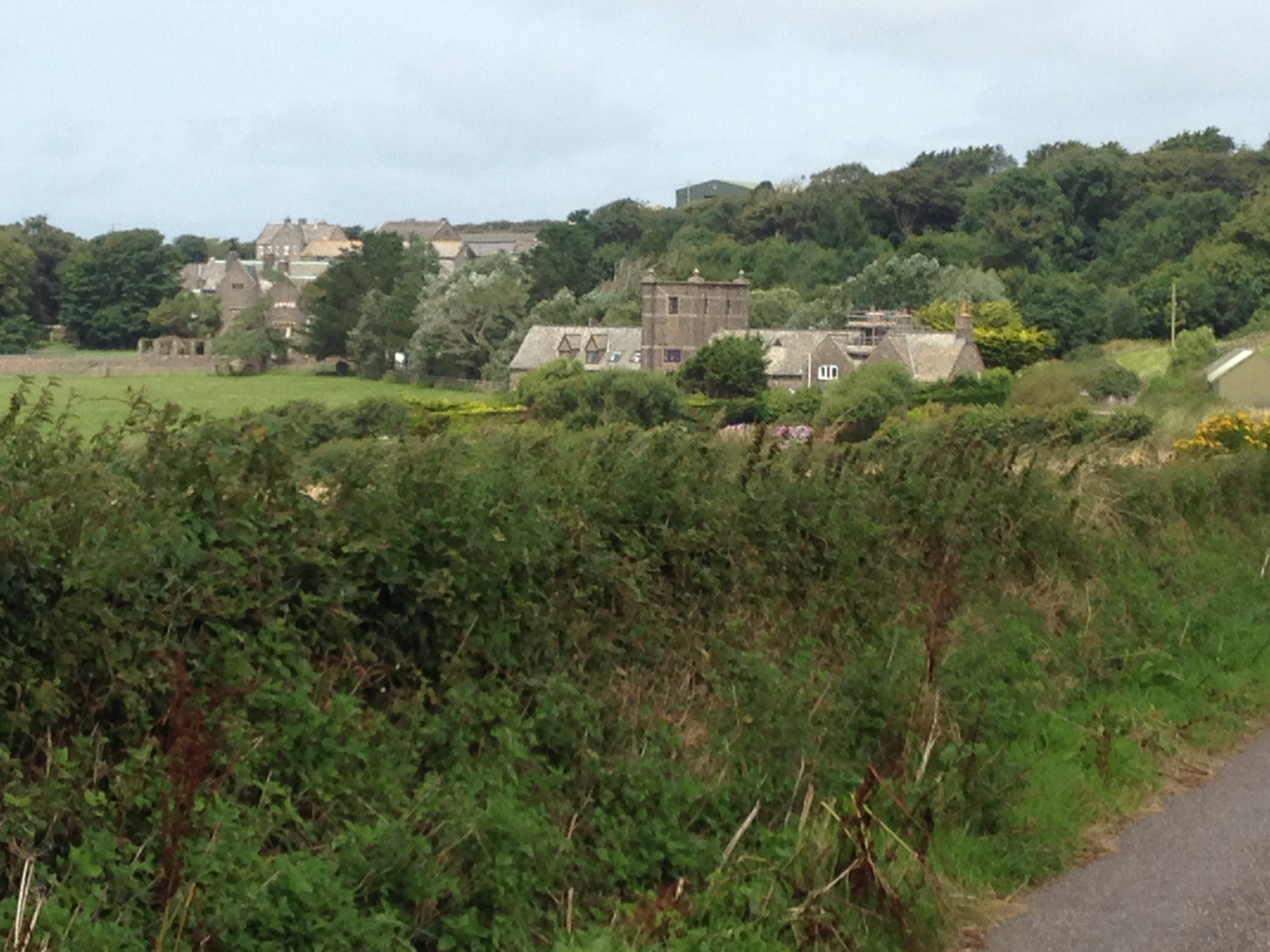
- A view of Pickwell

- Location within Devon
- OS grid reference: SS457409
- Civil parish: Georgeham
- District: North Devon
- Shire county: Devon
- Region: South West
- Country: England
- Sovereign state: United Kingdom
- Post town: BRAUNTON
- Postcode district: EX33
- Dialling code: 01271
- Police: Devon and Cornwall
- Fire: Devon and Somerset
- Ambulance: South Western
- UK Parliament: North Devon

Pickwell is a small settlement with a converted manor house in the civil parish Georgeham, in the North Devon district, in the county Devon, England.

Pickwell lies between the village Georgeham and the coast above Woolacombe and Putsborough beach, close to the South West Coast Path. It gives its name to the Pickwell Down Sandstones Formation, which are red and brown sandstones with shales which extend from the hills of Pickwell Down and Woolacombe Down overlooking Morte Bay east-southeastwards to Muddiford and Bratton Fleming.

== History ==
Pickwell was known as pediccheswella in the Domesday Book.

The manor was owned by John Harris who was the member of parliament for Barnstaple in the mid 19th century.

During the Victorian era Pickwell was owned by the Hole family who paid for much of the restoration of St George's church in Georgeham. The church contains a "Pickwell chapel" which dates from 1762 and is separated from the body of the church by an ornate screen.

=== Manor house ===
The manor house still contains some of the structure which built in the late medieval period, however it was largely rebuilt between 1902 and 1905 for Sir Montague Style of the Style baronets. It is a Grade II listed building.

The main range of the house, which is in a Jacobean style, is L-shaped and consists of two storeys. The central gable has an oculus. To the rear of the range is a 15th-century doorway with a moulded surround. In the grounds is a folly built to resemble a chapel.

The manor house has now been converted into self-catering holiday apartments and a wedding venue. Several of the surrounding farm buildings are also available for rent.
