= Out of Step =

Out of Step may refer to:

- Out of Step (television programme), a documentary series made by Associated-Rediffusion in 1957
- Out of Step (EP), sole EP by band Minor Threat released in 1983
- Out of Step (film), 2002 film about an LDS young woman from Utah who moves to New York, New York to pursue and education in dance at New York University
- "Out of Step", 2009 Japanese song composed by Wowaka using digital singer Hatsune Miku for vocals
- Out of Step, the memoir of Sidney Hook
- Out of Step Films (company), 2017 Toronto independent film company.
