= Erchenbald =

Anglo-Saxon nobleman

Erchenbald or Archembald was a mesne lord listed in the Domesday Book of 1086 as a tenant of nine manors in Devon and Cornwall, England. He is believed to be the first English ancestor of the prominent Fleming family.

== Landholdings ==
The Domesday book records that Erchenbald held three manors in Cornwall and six in Devon, all as tenant of Robert, Count of Mortain, who was a half-brother of William the Conqueror and held over one hundred west country manors as tenant-in-chief.

Erchenbald's landholdings recorded in the Domesday Book are as follows.
In Cornwall:

- Brea, Cornwall (in Connerton Hundred)
- Avalde, Cornwall (in Fawton Hundred)
- Bodbrane, Cornwall (in Fawton Hundred)

In Devon:

- Culleigh, in the parish of Frithelstock in Shebbear hundred, Devon;
- Alverdiscott, in Fremington Hundred, Devon;
- Bratton, in Braunton Hundred, Devon, today known as Bratton Fleming;
- Croyde, in the parish of Georgeham, in Braunton Hundred, Devon
- Hele, Devon (probably in Meeth parish)
- Stockleigh, Devon (Meeth parish, Shebbear Hundred)

Erchenbald was also recorded as holding livestock (five cattle & eight sheep) in the manor of Weare (Giffard), Devon, which was held from Robert Count of Mortain by Roald Dubbed.

== Fleming family ==
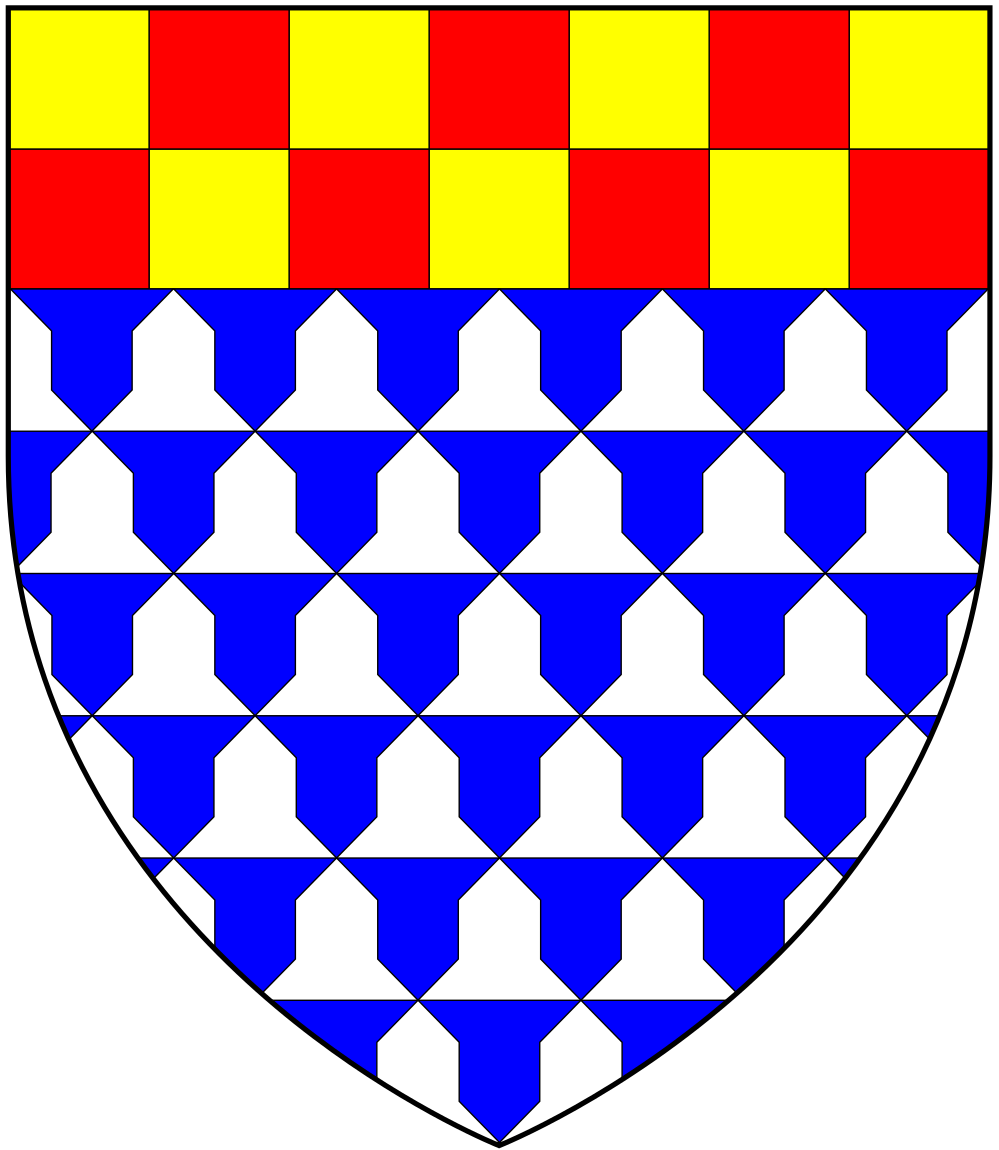
Arms of Fleming of Bratton Fleming

Erchenbald is assumed to be the first English ancestor of the family surnamed "Fleming", of Bratton Fleming. He came to England during the reign of William the Conqueror (1066–1087) and was a follower of that king's uterine half-brother Robert, Count of Mortain. He was succeeded by his son, Stephen (fl. 1145), whose son, "Erchenbald son of Stephen" occurs as holder of several knight's fees in Devon and Cornwall in the 1166 Liber Niger ("Return of the Barons"). He went to Ireland with Henry II in 1171 and participated in Hugh de Lacy's plantation of the Kingdom of Mide. Succeeding Flemings were Stephen, died c. 1213 – 1214 and Baldwin, died 1260.
