= St George's Church, Georgeham =

Grade I listed church in Georgeham, Devon, United Kingdom

Coordinates: 51°08′15″N 4°11′44″W

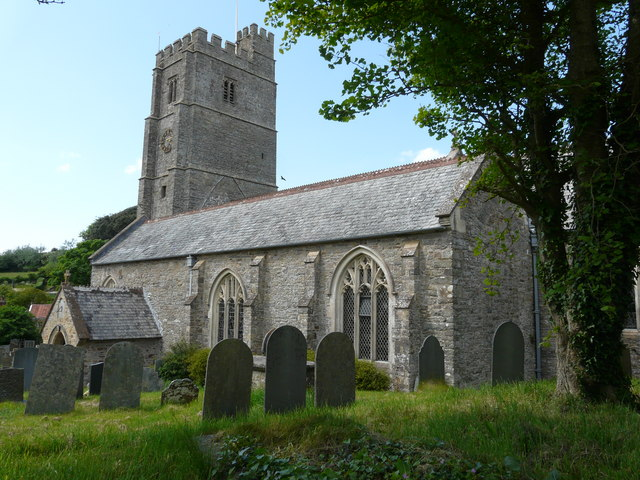
St George's church in Georgeham

St George's Church is the Anglican parish church for the village of Georgeham in Devon. Dedicated to Saint George, the 13th-century church comes under the Diocese of Exeter and has been designated a Grade I listed building since 25 February 1965.

== History ==
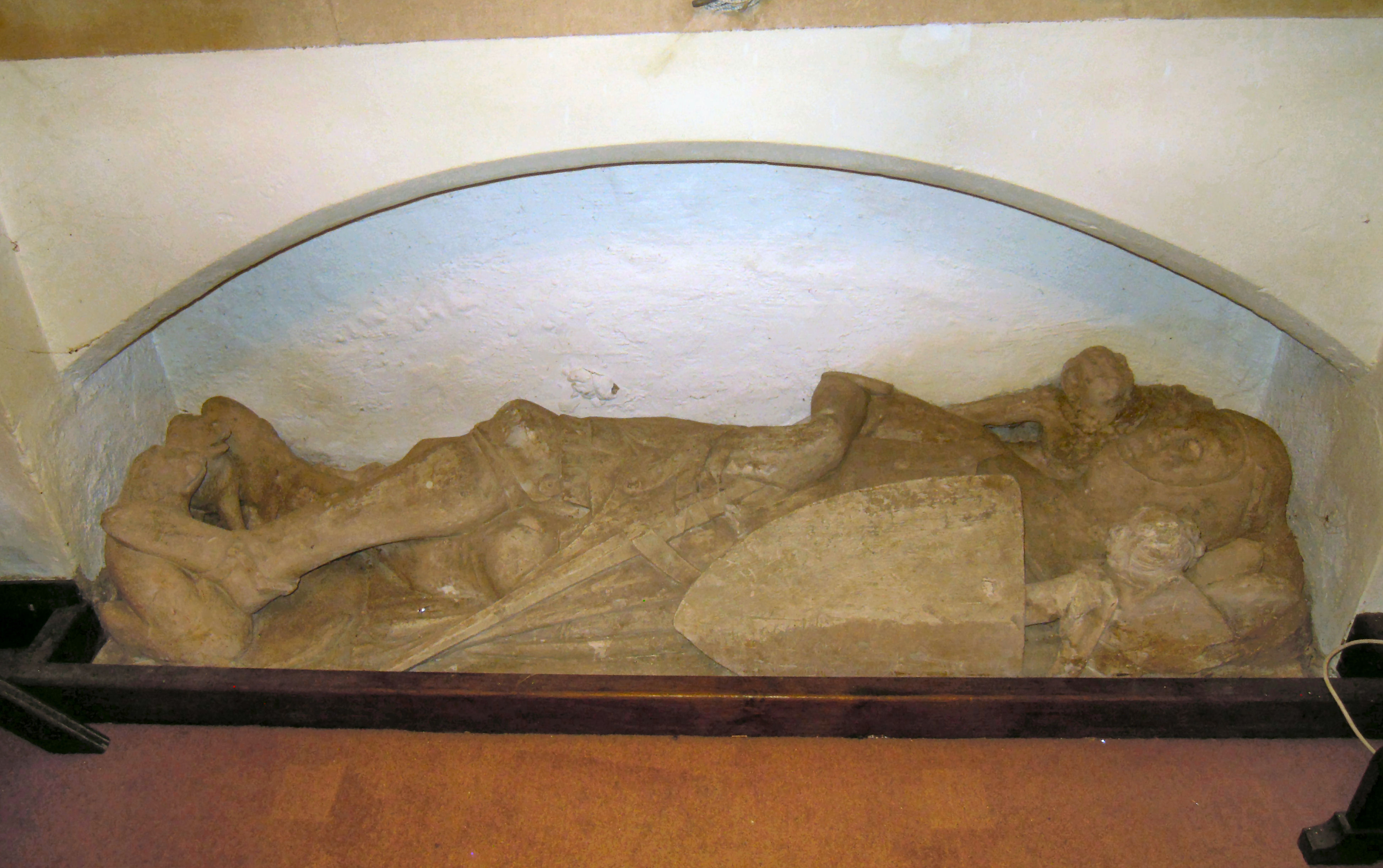
The 13th-century effigy to Sir Mauger de St Aubyn III (died 1294)

The first record of a church in the village was in 1231 when Robert de Edington was recorded as the 'persona' or parson and patron of Hamme. There may have been an earlier church on the site in Saxon or Norman times but there is no firm evidence for this other than some 13th-century artifacts in the church. These include a stone font to the right of the altar; a small carving of the Crucifixion in the chancel c.1300 with mutilated heads to Christ and two flanking figures of John and Mary with weeping angels to each end of the Cross; a piscina on the south wall of the Pickwell Chapel, and a prone effigy of a knight also in the Pickwell Chapel (c1294). Also, there is a small quatrefoil window in the north wall of the chancel near the altar and a trefoil-headed piscina in the chancel, both dating to the 14th-century. The first record of the church being dedicated to Saint George was in 1356.

Built of random stone rubble with large blocks to tower, the building has ashlar dressings to the openings and dressed stone quoins. The oldest part of the building is the 14th-century tower which is of three stages with set back buttresses and an embattled parapet and stair turret with four slit windows to the north side. Externally on the east side of the tower there are traces of a higher nave than the present one. The main arcade between the nave and side aisle with its arches is most likely 15th-century.

== Design ==
The Pickwell Chapel with its Georgian Screen

The south porch bears a wall sundial dated 1773 which may also be the date of the porch. A major restoration in 1762 changed the church interior to a Classic or Romanesque style at which time most of the windows were altered. The wooden screen between the nave and the Pickwell Chapel with its Corinthian pilasters and broken segmental pediment dates to this time and was restored in 1912. New boxed seating was installed in 1767 together with raised galleries for the gentry on the west wall.

Further restoration took place under James Fowler in 1876 when the box pews in the nave were replaced with the current pews and the elevated gallery was removed. The vestry was enlarged and parts of the chancel were rebuilt. The Last Supper reredos above the altar dates from this period while a new pulpit of Caen stone was installed; this has carvings of St John the Baptist in the wilderness, the Sermon on the Mount and Saint Paul in Athens. There are unceiled waggon roofs to nave and south aisle with carved bosses at each of the intersections. The arcade of bays has Pevsner 'B' type piers with leaf capitals to the main shafts.

== Memorials ==
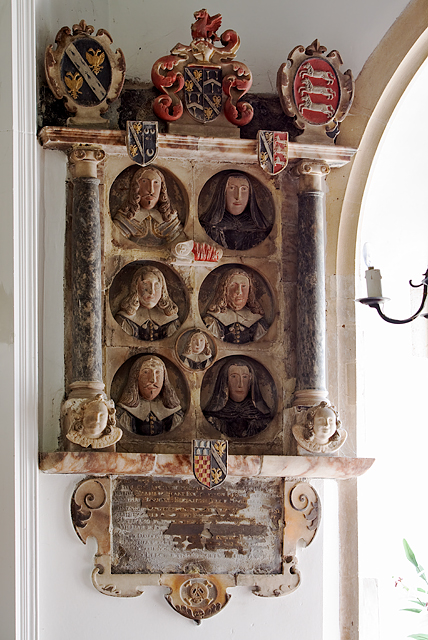
Mural monument to Tobie Newcourt (d.1645) and his descendants

The Harris Family Monument

The stone effigy in the Pickwell Chapel is of Sir Mauger St Aubyn III, who fought the Welsh in 1283 and who died in 1294. According to local legend, he was of giant-like stature and of so great a strength that he threw a heavy stone into Georgeham over a great distance and two strong men of half his age could not lift it. His effigy shows him as 6 feet (1.83 metres) tall, cross-legged with two dogs at his feet, a sword, shield and supportive angels. His wife Isabel Pickwell (died after 1308) is also buried in the church but her monument has not survived, most probably having been moved during the Georgian or Victorian restorations.

The Newcourt Family monument (see left) is the oldest wall memorial in the church dating to 1645 and is dedicated to Tobie Newcourt. It show Tobie Newcourt his son William and his four sons: John, William, Tobie and another John. The two female heads represent the wives of Tobie and his son.

The Harris Family monument dates to 1776 and was erected by Honour Harris in the Pickwell Chapel to her parents Dorothy and John Harris (MP for Barnstaple) and their three children who had died in infancy. On Honour Harris's death a cameo carving of her was placed on the monument. The memorial to the Chichester Family is on the wall to the right of the altar and is to William Chichester, who was Rector at St George's church from 1750 to 1770, and his wife, Mary. The memorial also mentions his daughter Ann Chichester (1751-1780).

The large bible in the Pickwell Chapel is a memento to Archibald Cleveland who took part in the Charge of the Light Brigade in October 1854 but who was subsequently killed during the Battle of Inkerman in November 1854. On the north wall of the nave is a memorial to Croyde resident Henry Tinker who drowned in 1916 while trying to save a lady who had gotten into difficulties off Croyde Beach. The plaque shows the Royal Humane Society Medal which was awarded to him posthumously. The copper insignia can rotate on its centre to show both faces of the disc.

== The Parish Map ==
On the south wall of the nave is a tapestry map of Georgeham Parish which was unveiled in 1995. The stitching took more than 3,000 hours to complete and was achieved with the co-operation of about 85 Georgeham and Croyde artists and embroiderers, with 70 children from Georgeham Primary School also contributing. The project was initiated by the Women's Institute and commemorated the 75th anniversary of the founding of the WI in the Devon area and was displayed at The Barbican in London in 1996.

== Other features ==
The Sanctuary

View up the nave

The stained glass is mainly 19th and 20th-century with the exception of the north quatrefoil window which is 14th-century and which was discovered hidden during the Victorian restoration. It was repositioned in the chancel and glazed with a picture of an angel holding a scroll on which is written "Sanctus Sanctus Sanctus".

The organ was installed in 1881 in memory of Frances (died 1880), daughter of the Reverend William Spurway and widow of the Reverend Francis Hole, who was Rector from 1831 to his death in 1866. The organ was restored in 1999 at a cost of £10,000 when the hand pump was converted to an electric one.

The tower has a peal of eight bells: five were cast in 1748, one in 1765 and the last two in 1926. The church clock was installed in 1921 in memory of those parishioners who died on active service during World War I and was paid for by residents of the village. In 2014 as part of the WWI centenary commemoration the dial and hands were regilded and an electric winding mechanism was installed.

The murals on either side of the altar represent Saints Francis and George, the Archangel and the Virgin Mary and are the work of artist Margaret Kemp-Welch, who lived in the village during the 1920s and 1930s.

== Notable burials ==
Buried in the churchyard are:

- Henry Williamson (1895–1977), author of Tarka the Otter.
- Negley Farson (1890–1960), American author and adventurer
