= Alexander Wicksteed =

Alexander Wicksteed (6 September 1875 – 30 July 1935) was an English traveller and writer from St Pancras, London. Wicksteed, a Quaker, originally went to Soviet Russia to assist with famine relief, living there in the years after the October Revolution, and is best known for his books based on that period, Life Under the Soviets (1928) and Ten Years in Soviet Moscow (1933). He was a friend and travelling companion of the American journalist Negley Farson, and the two travelled together through the western Caucasus in 1929. Farson dedicated his book Caucasian Journey to Wicksteed.

After 15 years in the Soviet Union, Wicksteed died in Moscow of chronic bronchitis after a weeklong illness.
