= Putsborough =

Hamlet in Devon, England

Coordinates: 51.148°N 4.221°W

- Hamlet
- Interactive map of Putsborough
- First Recorded Reference: 1313

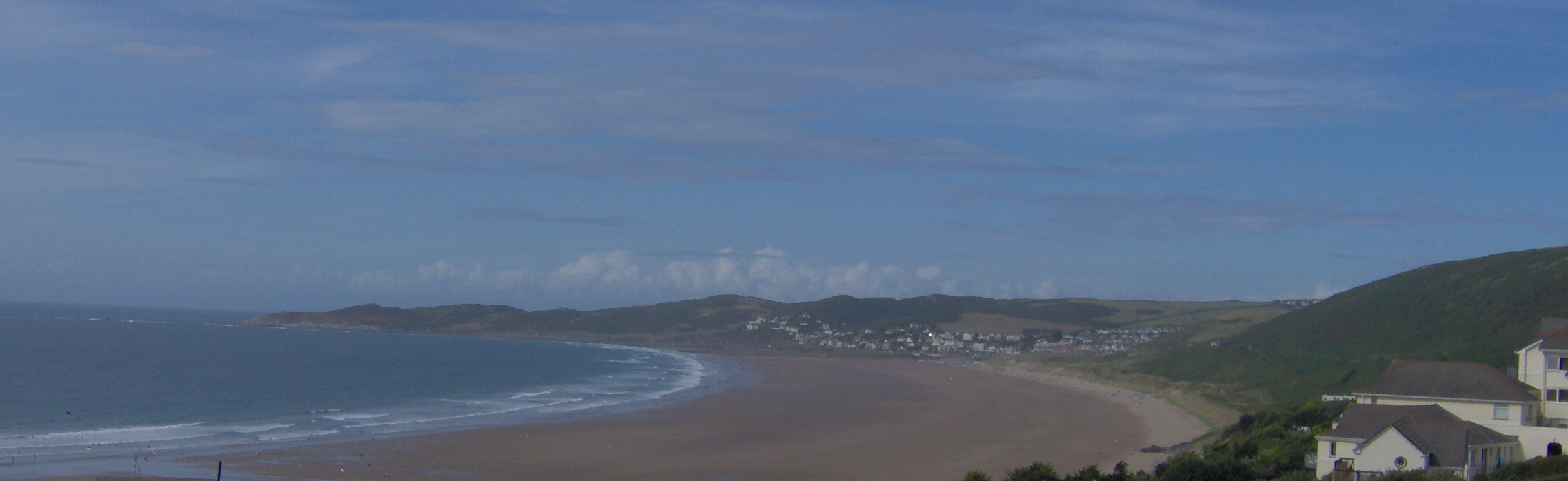
Putsborough Beach, looking towards Woolacombe

Map showing the location of Putsborough Sand within Devon

Putsborough is a hamlet in Georgeham Civil Parish on the west-facing coast of North Devon, England. It is about 3/4 mile (1.2 km) north of the village of Croyde and 1 mile (1.6 km) west-northwest of the village of Georgeham. 0.5 miles (0.8 km) north of the hamlet is Putsborough Sands, which forms the southern part of the two-mile-long (3 km) beach of Woolacombe Sand on Morte Bay.

== Settlement ==
The manor house has an adjoining cluster of privately owned homes and holiday homes, a caravan site and a campsite. The manor house itself is Grade II listed and made of stone, cob and thatch construction, with origins dating back to the 17th century. The first recorded written reference to Putsborough is from 1313; however there is mention in Domesday Book to a sister of Ordulf (a Saxon lord who held the manor of Georgeham and Croyde, amongst others in Devon) who tried to found her own separate manor – possibly Putsborough.

The hamlet is a conservation area in the North Devon Coast Area of Outstanding Natural Beauty. The South West Coast Path runs past it between Woolacombe and Croyde and around Baggy Point with views towards Lundy Island and the coast of south Wales.

== Beach ==
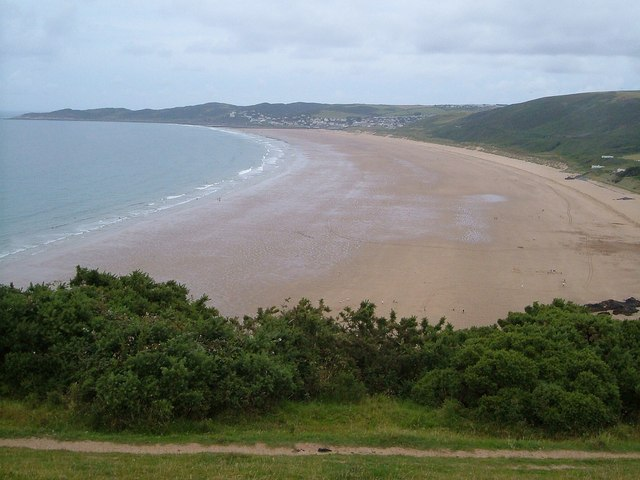
Putsborough Sands - the surfing beach

Putsborough Sands is the name given to the southern part of Woolacombe Sands. It is a sandy beach with some rock pools, protected by Baggy Point from the prevailing southwesterly winds. The beach is privately owned and the car park is reached by a narrow road with passing places. Above the beach are a small caravan site, beach shop and toilet.
