= List of shipwrecks in June 1867 =

The list of shipwrecks in June 1867 includes ships sunk, foundered, grounded, or otherwise lost during June 1867.

== 1 June ==
List of shipwrecks: 1 June 1867
Ship	State	Description
Assaye	United Kingdom	The full-rigged ship struck the South Rock and foundered off the Blackwater Lightship ( Trinity House). Her 21 crew survived. She was on a voyage from Demerara, British Guiana to Liverpool, Lancashire.
Sirene	Hamburg	The ship was sunk by ice off Hogland, Russia. she was on a voyage from Hambury to Saint Petersburg, Russia.

== 2 June ==
List of shipwrecks: 2 June 1867
Ship	State	Description
Enos	Ottoman Empire	The ship was driven ashore at Tangier, Morocco. Her crew were rescued. She was on a voyage from Enos to Queenstown, County Cork, United Kingdom. She was consequently condemned.
John	United Kingdom	The schooner sank off Ilfracombe, Devon. Her crew survived. She was on a voyage from Cardiff, Glamorgan to Belfast, County Antrim.
Juffer Jannette	Netherlands	The ship was sunk by ice off Hogland, Russia. Her crew were rescued. She was on a voyage from Newcastle upon Tyne, Northumberland, United Kingdom to Saint Petersburg, Russia.
William	Norway	The ship was sunk by ice off Hogland.

== 3 June ==
List of shipwrecks: 3 June 1867
Ship	State	Description
Cumberland	United Kingdom	The ship was lost. She was on a voyage from Philadelphia, Pennsylvania, United States to Sligo.
Granton	United Kingdom	The steamship ran aground on the Borkum Reef. She was on a voyage from Hamburg to London. She was refloated and resumed her voyage.
Guide	United Kingdom	The ship was wrecked north of the Rio Grande. Her crew were rescued.
Harlequin	United Kingdom	The steamship was driven ashore in the Elbe. She was on a voyage from Hamburg to Hull, Yorkshire. She was refloated the next day.
James Carey	United States	The ship was wrecked between "Porto Negro" and Cape Frio, Brazil. Her crew were rescued.
Mary	United Kingdom	The schooner ran aground on the Tuskar Rock. She was on a voyage from Waterford to Bristol, Gloucestershire. She was refloated the next day and resumed her voyage, but was consequently beached at the mouth of the Ogmore River in a sinking condition. She was refloated on 7 June and beached near Porthcawl, Glamorgan for repairs.
Nereiden	Russia	The ship was wrecked on Naissaar. She was on a voyage from Hartlepool, County Durham, United Kingdom to Kronstadt.
Ouse	United Kingdom	The steamship was wrecked at Thisted, Denmark. All on board were rescued. She was on a voyage from Hull, Yorkshire to Stettin and Riga, Russia.

== 4 June ==
List of shipwrecks: 4 June 1867
Ship	State	Description
Beatrice	United Kingdom	The schooner was driven ashore in Loch Sunart. She was on a voyage from Newcastle upon Tyne, Northumberland to Dublin. Beatrice was refloated and beached at Tobermory, Isle of Mull for inspection. She resumed her voyage.
George Robinson	United Kingdom	The brig ran aground on the Goodwin Sands, Kent. She was on a voyage from Newhaven, Sussex to Sunderland, County Durham. She was refloated and resumed her voyage.
Jessie	United Kingdom	The schooner ran aground at the mouth of the River Spey. She was on a voyage from Seaham, County Durham to Dundee, Forfarshire. She was refloated and towed in to Dundee in a severely leaky condition.
Russell	United Kingdom	The ship was wrecked on the Prato Shoals. She was on a voyage from Antwerp, Belgium to Havana, Cuba.

== 5 June ==
List of shipwrecks: 5 June 1867
Ship	State	Description
Countess of Durham	United Kingdom	The schooner ran aground on the Brake Sand, in the North Sea. She was on a voyage from Hartlepool, County Durham to Deal, Kent. She was refloated.
Freedom	United Kingdom	The barque was destroyed by fire at Odesa, Russia.
Industry	United Kingdom	The ship was driven ashore at Porthcawl, Glamorgan. She was on a voyage from "Ballinacura" to Highbridge, Somerset. She was refloated on 7 June.
Jessie	United Kingdom	The brig ran aground off Hanko, Grand Duchy of Finland and was wrecked. She was on a voyage from London to Kronstadt, Russia.
Lindisfarne	United Kingdom	The ship collided with Gazelle (United Kingdom) and sank in The Downs. She was on a voyage from South Shields, County Durham to Deal, Kent.
Quebec	United Kingdom	The ship at "Le Polle". She was on a voyage from Troon, Ayrshire to Quebec City, Province of Canada, British North America.
Sea	United Kingdom	The ship was driven ashore at Helsingborg, Sweden.

== 6 June ==
List of shipwrecks: 6 June 1867
Ship	State	Description
Fenna Gezina	Flag unknown	The schooner brig was holed by ice and foundered near Reval, Russia. Her crew were rescued. She was on a voyage from Liverpool, Lancashire to Saint Petersburg, Russia.
Odessan	Russia	The steamship was run into by the steamship Famise (France) and was severely damaged at Constantinople, Ottoman Empire.
San Nicholas	Spain	The ship was wrecked on the Rising Rock, off Nassau, Bahamas. She was on a voyage from Havana, Cuba to Falmouth, Cornwall, United Kingdom.

== 7 June ==
List of shipwrecks: 7 June 1867
Ship	State	Description
Annie Marie	Norway	The ship was wrecked at Belize City, British Honduras. She was on a voyage from Grimstad to Belize City.
Daniel	Sweden	The ship was wrecked near Söderhamn, She was on a voyage from Torrevecchia Teatina, Italy to Gävle.
Jerry	United Kingdom	The ship ran aground and capsized in the River Thames near Blackwall, Middlesex.
Maria Pauline	Netherlands	The ship was lost near Lemvig, Denmark. She was on a voyage from Dordrecht, South Holland to Riga, Russia.
Martha	United Kingdom	The ship ran aground on the Advent Reef, in the Karimata Strait. She was refloated and put in to Radang, Malaya in a leaky condition.
Speculation	United Kingdom	The ship was driven ashore on Naissaar, Russia. She was on a voyage from South Shields, County Durham to Kronstadt, Russia. She was refloated the next day and taken in to Reval, Russia.
Torquil	(United Kingdom of Great Britain and Ireland) Victoria	The 294-ton barque was wrecked in Spirits Bay, New Zealand. She sprang a leak on 3 June while heading to New Zealand from Tongatapu, and as her pumps were not strong enough to counteract the leak, she made for the nearest landfall. She was deliberately beached on the sands at Spirits Bay, but a strong gale sprung up, wrecking the vessel.

== 8 June ==
List of shipwrecks: 8 June 1867
Ship	State	Description
Gertruida	United Kingdom	The ship was sunk by ice in the Baltic Sea. She was on a voyage from Amsterdam, North Holland to Vyborg, Grand Duchy of Finland.
Mary Ann	United Kingdom	The ship sprang a leak and was beached on Ailsa Craig. She was on a voyage from Troon, Ayrshire to Newry, County Antrim.
Medusa	United Kingdom	The ship was driven ashore on Skagen, Denmark.

== 9 June ==
List of shipwrecks: 9 June 1867
Ship	State	Description
Wilhelm	Bremen	The ship was wrecked on the Sellen. She was on a voyage from the Firth of Forth to Bremen.

== 10 June ==
List of shipwrecks: 10 June 1867
Ship	State	Description
Justinian	United Kingdom	The ship was wrecked on Naissaar, Russia. Her crew were rescued. She was on a voyage from South Shields, County Durham to Kronstadt, Russia.

== 11 June ==
List of shipwrecks: 11 June 1867
Ship	State	Description
Beta	United Kingdom	The schooner was abandoned in the Atlantic Ocean. Her crew were rescued by Yuba (Norway). Beta was on a voyage from Cardiff, Glamorgan to Quebec City, Province of Canada, British North America.
Brilliant	Sweden	The brig was driven ashore at "Sandre", Gotland. She was on a voyage from Newcastle upon Tyne, Northumberland, United Kingdom to Gävle.

== 12 June ==
List of shipwrecks: 12 June 1867
Ship	State	Description
Burgh Castle	United Kingdom	The ship was driven ashore near Thurso, Caithness.
Fife Packet	United Kingdom	The ship was driven ashore at Red Bay, County Antrim. She was on a voyage from Belfast, County Antrim to Londonderry. She was refloated on 20 June.
Good Intent	United Kingdom	The ship was driven ashore near Thurso.
Margaret	United Kingdom	The ship was driven ashore on Minorca, Spain. Her crew were rescued. She was on a voyage from Sunderland, County Durham to Genoa, Italy

== 13 June ==
List of shipwrecks: 13 June 1867
Ship	State	Description
Elizabeth, and Lioness	(United Kingdom of Great Britain and Ireland) New Zealand	The cutter was wrecked at Hokitika. The tug Lioness ( (United Kingdom of Great Britain and Ireland) New Zealand), which was towing her, grounded on a sandspit, and the Elizabeth was carried into her by the tide. The tug was damaged, but the Elizabeth became a total wreck; she was on a voyage from Melbourne, Victoria to Hokitaka.
Florence Nightingale	United Kingdom	The brig sprang a leak and sank in the Bristol Channel. Her crew were rescued.
Jarrow	United Kingdom	The brig was driven ashore at Dagerort, Russia. She was refloated and taken in to Helsinki, Grand Duchy of Finland.

== 14 June ==
List of shipwrecks: 14 June 1867
Ship	State	Description
Helen Denny	United Kingdom	The ship ran aground on the Elephant Rock. She was on a voyage from the Clyde to Rangoon, Burma. She was refloated the next day.
Meteor	United Kingdom	The barque was destroyed by fire in the Atlantic Ocean with the loss of seven of her thirteen crew. Survivors were rescued by the full-rigged ship Lucien Paul ( Danzig). Meteor was on a voyage from New York, United States to London.
Nancy	France	The ship was driven ashore on Skagen, Denmark. She was on a voyage from a French port to Saint Petersburg, Russia. She was refloated and taken in to "Odenstentjor", Denmark.

== 15 June ==
List of shipwrecks: 15 June 1867
Ship	State	Description
Fisher	United Kingdom	The smack foundered off Girdle Ness, Aberdeenshire. Her crew were rescued. She was on a voyage from Newcastle upon Tyne, Northumberland to Ballintore, Ross-shire.
Westburn	United Kingdom	The ship ran aground in the Yangon River. She was on a voyage from Rangoon, Burma to Falmouth, Cornwall. She was refloated and put back to Rangoon for repairs.

== 16 June ==
List of shipwrecks: 16 June 1867
Ship	State	Description
Fisher	United Kingdom	The smack foundered in the North Sea 10 nautical miles (19 km) south west by west of Girdle Ness, Aberdeenshire. Her crew survived. She was on a voyage from Newcastle upon Tyne, Northumberland to a port in Ross-shire.

== 17 June ==
List of shipwrecks: 17 June 1867
Ship	State	Description
Godetideo	Norway	The barque was abandoned at sea. She was on a voyage from Christiania to Boston, Massachusetts, United States.
Texian	United Kingdom	The ship ran aground at Arbroath, Forfarshire. She was on a voyage from Riga, Russia to Arbroath. She was refloated and taken in to Arbroath.

== 18 June ==
List of shipwrecks: 18 June 1867
Ship	State	Description
Rebecca	United Kingdom	The ship caught fire 160 nautical miles (300 km) west of the Isles of Scilly and was abandoned by her crew, who were rescued by St. Croix ( (United Kingdom of Great Britain and Ireland) Barbados). Rebecca was on a voyage from Águilas, Spain to the River Tyne.

== 19 June ==
List of shipwrecks: 19 June 1867
Ship	State	Description
Abisto	Norway	The ship was sunk by ice off Arkhangelsk, Russia. Her crew survived.
Alpha	Norway	The ship was abandoned in ice off Arkhangelsk. Her crew survived. She was subsequently taken in to Arkhangelsk.
Alliance	Norway	The ship was sunk in ice off Arkhangelsk. Her crew survived.
Bis, or Fix	United Kingdom	The ship was sunk by ice off Arkhangelsk. Her crew survived.
Bogota	United Kingdom	The ship was sunk by ice in the White Sea. Her crew survived.
Brothers	United Kingdom	The barque was sunk by ice off Arkhangelsk. Her crew survived. She was on a voyage from Burntisland, Fife to Arkhangelsk.
Charity	United Kingdom	The ship was sunk by ice off Arkhangelsk. Her crew survived.
C. H. Gent	Russia	The schooner was abandoned in ice off Arkhangelsk. Four crew were rescued on 14 July by the steamship Lindesnaes (Norway). C. H. Gent was on a voyage from London, United Kingdom to Arkhangelsk. She was subsequently taken in to Arkhangelsk.
Chieftain	United Kingdom	The schooner was sunk by ice off Arkhangelsk. Her crew survived.
Christine	United Kingdom	The ship was sunk by ice in the White Sea. Her crew survived.
Christine Agathe	Norway	The ship was sunk by ice off Arkhangelsk/. Her crew survived.
Conqueror	United Kingdom	The ship was sunk by ice off Arkhangelsk. Her crew survived.
Crane	United Kingdom	The barque was sunk by ice off Arkhangelsk. Her crew survived.
Curlew	United Kingdom	The ship was sunk by ice off Arkhangelsk. Her crew survived.
Da Capo	Norway	The brig was abandoned in ice in the White Sea. Her crew survived She was subsequently taken in to Arkhangelsk.
Doris	United Kingdom	The ship was abandoned in the White Sea. She was subsequently taken in to Arkhangelsk.
Earl of Fife	United Kingdom	The schooner was sunk by ice off Arkhangelsk. Her crew survived.
Eident	United Kingdom	The schooner was sunk by ice off Arkhangelsk. Her crew survived.
Effort	United Kingdom	The schooner was sunk by ice off Arkhangelsk. Her crew were rescued by the barque Albania (United Kingdom).
Emanuel	Norway	The ship was sunk by ice off Arkhangelsk. Her crew survived.
Embla	Norway	The ship was sunk by ice off Arkhangelsk. Her crew survived.
Enterprise	Denmark	The ship was abandoned in the White Sea. She was subsequently taken in to Arkhangelsk.
Eunomia	Norway	The ship was sunk by ice off Arkhangelsk. Her crew survived.
Evident	United Kingdom	The ship was sunk by ice off Arkhangelsk. Her crew survived.
Familien	Denmark	The ship was sunk by ice in the White Sea.
Fantasia	Norway	The ship was sunk by ice off Arkhangelsk. Her crew survived.
Frœnderne	Norway	The ship was abandoned in ice in the White Sea. Her crew survived. She was subsequently taken in to Arkhangelsk.
Henriette	Norway	The ship was sunk by ice off Arkhangelsk. Her crew survived.
Henry	United Kingdom	The ship was sunk by ice off Arkhangelsk. Her crew survived.
Ibis	United Kingdom	The ship was sunk by ice in the White Sea. Her crew survived.
Johanna Louise	Norway	The ship was sunk by ice off Arkhangelsk. Her crew survived.
Johannes Parrata	Norway	The ship was abandoned in ice off Arkhangelsk. Her crew survived. She was subsequently taken in to Arkhangelsk.
Juno	United Kingdom	The ship was sunk by ice off Arkhangelsk. Her crew survived.
Ken	United Kingdom	The ship was sunk by ice off Arkhangelsk. Her crew survived.
Liburna	United Kingdom	The ship was abandoned in the White Sea. She was subsequently taken in to Arkhangelsk.
Lively	United Kingdom	The ship was sunk by ice in the White Sea.
Livlig	Norway	The ship was abandoned in ice off Arkhangelsk. She was subsequently taken in to Arkhangelsk. Her crew survived.
Llewellyn	United Kingdom	The ship was sunk by ice off Arkhangelsk. Her crew survived.
Lorelee	United Kingdom	The ship was sunk by ice off Arkhangelsk. Her crew survived.
Lyna	Norway	The ship was abandoned in ice off Arkhangelsk. Her crew survived. She was subsequently taken in to Arkhangelsk.
Mercurius	Norway	The ship was sunk by ice off Arkhangelsk. Her crew survived.
Nereiden	Norway	The ship was sunk by ice off Arkhangelsk. Her crew survived.
Norden	Norway	The ship was sunk by ice in the White Sea. Her crew survived.
Matanzas	United Kingdom	The brig was sunk by ice off Arkhangelsk. Her crew survived.
Napoleon	Norway	The ship was abandoned in the White Sea. Her crew survived. She was subsequently taken in to Arkhangelsk.
Onward	United Kingdom	The schooner was sunk by ice off Arkhangelsk. Her crew were rescued by the steamship Ashford (United Kingdom).
Perseverance	United Kingdom	The brig was sunk by ice off Arkhangelsk. Her crew survived.
Prince of Wales	United Kingdom	The ship was sunk by ice off Arkhangelsk. Her crew survived.
Prinds Oscar	Norway	The ship was sunk by ice off Arkhangelsk. Her crew survived.
Providentia	Norway	The ship was sunk by ice off Arkhangelsk. Her crew survived.
Rogan	United Kingdom	The ship was sunk by ice off Arkhangelsk. Her crew survived.
Scotia	United Kingdom	The schooner was sunk by ice off Arkhangelsk. Her crew survived.
USS Sacramento	United States Navy	The sloop-of-war was wrecked on a reef at the mouth of the Godavari River without loss of life.
Santiago	United Kingdom	The ship was sunk by ice off Arkhangelsk. Her crew survived.
St. Clair	United Kingdom	The ship was abandoned in the White Sea. She was subsequently taken in to Arkhangelsk.
St. Jago	United Kingdom	The ship was sunk by ice in the White Sea.
Surprise	United Kingdom	The brigantine was wrecked on Mud Island, Province of Canada. She was on a voyage from New York to Halifax, Nova Scotia.
Thomas and William Nicol	Norway	The ship was sunk by ice off Arkhangelsk. Her crew survived.
Trident	United Kingdom	The barque was sunk by ice off Arkhangelsk. Her crew were rescued by Melbourne (United Kingdom). Trident was on a voyage from Arkhangelsk to Dundee, Forfarshire.
Vangant	United Kingdom	The ship was sunk by ice of Arkhangelsk. Her crew survived.
Venus	United Kingdom	The brig was sunk by ice off Arkhangelsk. She was on a voyage from Montrose, Forfarshire to Arkhangelsk. Her crew survived.
Westerwick	Norway	The ship was sunk by ice in the White Sea. Her crew survived.
Wodute	Norway	The ship was abandoned in ice in the White Sea. Her crew survived. She was subsequently taken in to Arkhangelsk.

== 20 June ==
List of shipwrecks: 20 June 1867
Ship	State	Description
Alpha	(United Kingdom of Great Britain and Ireland) New Zealand	The 18-ton cutter went ashore at Ahipara during a strong gale and became a total wreck.
Jacomine	United Kingdom	The ship was run aground on Neckman's Ground, in the Baltic Sea and was abandoned by her crew. She was on a voyage from Newcastle upon Tyne, Northumberland to Saint Petersburg, Russia.
Tae-wan	United Kingdom	The ship was wrecked in the Min River. She was on a voyage from Foochowfoo, China to London.

== 21 June ==
List of shipwrecks: 21 June 1867
Ship	State	Description
Canaradzo	Chile	The ship was sighted off Deal, Kent, United Kingdom whilst on a voyage from Sunderland, County Durham, United Kingdom to Valparaíso. No further trace, presumed foundered with the loss of all hands.
Catherine Agatha	Hamburg	The ship was lost at Carbonear, Newfoundland, British North America. She was on a voyage from Harbour Grace to Carbonear.
J. C. Colison	(United Kingdom of Great Britain and Ireland) New South Wales	The schooner was wrecked at "Shoulbearen". She was on a voyage from the Tweed River to Sydney.
Lord of the Isles	(United Kingdom of Great Britain and Ireland) New South Wales	The ketch was wrecked at Kiama.
Tamerlane	Prussia	The brig was wrecked on the coast of Sumatra, Netherlands East Indies. She was on a voyage from Penang, Malaya to London, United Kingdom.

== 22 June ==
List of shipwrecks: 22 June 1867
Ship	State	Description
Georges	United Kingdom	The schooner sprang a leak and foundered in the Atlantic Ocean. Her crew were rescued by Falcon (United Kingdom). She was on a voyage from Pomaron, Portugal to Newcastle upon Tyne, Northumberland.
Ossian	United Kingdom	The steamship was driven ashore on Öland, Sweden. She was on a voyage from Riga, Russia to London. She was later refloated and resumed her voyage.

== 23 June ==
List of shipwrecks: 23 June 1867
Ship	State	Description
Agnes	(United Kingdom of Great Britain and Ireland) New Zealand	The 100-ton schooner was wrecked at the mouth of the Tūranganui River near Gisborne when the wind died as she was entering the river and the tide carried her onto rocks.

== 24 June ==
List of shipwrecks: 24 June 1867
Ship	State	Description
Industry	United Kingdom	The schooner was wrecked on the Dasher Rock, off Baggy Point, Devon.
Peace	United Kingdom	The schooner sank in the River Thames at Cubitt Town, Middlesex. She was refloated on 27 June and beached at East Greenwich, Kent.

== 25 June ==
List of shipwrecks: 25 June 1867
Ship	State	Description
Main	United Kingdom	The ship was driven ashore at Cromer, Norfolk. She was refloated on 1 July and taken in to Lowestoft, Suffolk.
Segundo Barcelp	Spain	The ship caught fire at Barcelona. She was scuttled the next day.
W. F. Storer	United States	The ship ran aground in the East River. She was on a voyage from Liverpool, Lancashire, United Kingdom to New York. She was refloated on 27 June and taken in to New York.
William	United Kingdom	The ship ran agroudin the East River. She was on a voyage from Liverpool to New York.

== 26 June ==
List of shipwrecks: 26 June 1867
Ship	State	Description
HMS Doterel	Royal Navy	The Britomart-class gunboat ran aground. She was refloated and returned to service.
Ramita	Danzig	The ship was lost near St. Ubes, Portugal.
Thomas Rising	United Kingdom	The ship was wrecked off South Stack, Anglesey, She was on a voyage from Par, Cornwall to Runcorn, Cheshire.

== 27 June ==
List of shipwrecks: 27 June 1867
Ship	State	Description
Catherine Hill	(United Kingdom of Great Britain and Ireland) Victoria	The schooner was wrecked on "Bord Island Point" with the loss of two of her crew. She was on a voyage from the Richmond River to Melbourne.

== 28 June ==
List of shipwrecks: 28 June 1867
Ship	State	Description
Venus	United Kingdom	The paddle steamer ran aground in the Clyde at Gourock, Renfrewshire. She was refloated and resumed her voyage in a leaky condition and was consequently beached at Lamlash, Isle of Arran. With her bow and stern aground, she became sagged. Venus made a voyage to Glasgow, Renfrewshire the next day and returned leaking even more severely and was beached at Lamlash in a waterlogged condition.
Victor	United Kingdom	The ship was driven ashore at Dundee, Forfarshire.

== Unknown date ==
List of shipwrecks: Unknown date in June 1867
Ship	State	Description
Active	Norway	The full-rigged ship was wrecked at Tupilco, Mexico.
Bella Galega	Spain	The ship was wrecked on "Clos de Mer Island". She was on a voyage from Macao, China to Havana, Cuba.
Bombay	United Kingdom	The ship was wrecked at Bombay, India. She was on a voyage from Bombay to Liverpool, Lancashire.
Clemence Eugenie	France	The ship was wrecked on Rodrigues.
Coaxer	United Kingdom	The ship was abandoned in the Atlantic Ocean before 7 June. Her crew were rescued. She was on a voyage from Cádiz to Saint John, New Brunswick, British North America.
Eva	United Kingdom	The barque was abandoned in the Atlantic Ocean before 28 June. Her crew were rescued. She was on a voyage from Glasgow, Renfrewshire to Boston, Massachusetts, United States.
Fawn	United Kingdom	The ship was wrecked on Grand Bahama, Bahamas.
Fleetly	United States	The ship was wrecked on Saona Island, Dominican Republic. She was on a voyage from Boston, Massachusetts to Jacmel, Haiti.
Fleetwing	United Kingdom	The barque was wrecked on Tom Shot's Point, at the mouth of the Calabar River.
France	France	The ship was destroyed by fire at Dénia, Spain. She was on a voyage from Toulon, Var to Saigon, French Cochinchina.
G. Griswold	United States	The ship was wrecked at Rio de Janeiro, Brazil. She was on a voyage from Rio de Janeiro to San Francisco, California.
Golden Horn	United Kingdom	The steamship was driven ashore in the Dardanelles. She was on a voyage from Odesa, Russia to Antwerp, Belgium. She was refloated.
Irene	United Kingdom	The barque was wrecked at the mouth of the Bonny River.
Inkerman	United Kingdom	The ship was wrecked in the Nun River. She was on a voyage from London to the Brass River. The wreck was plundered by the local inhabitants.
Kunea	United States	The ship was wrecked on Saona Island. She was on a voyage from New York to Saint Domingo.
Lady Sale	United Kingdom	The ship was abandoned in the Atlantic Ocean before 19 June. Her crew were rescued. She was on a voyage from Cardiff, Glamorgan to Quebec City.
Lochiel	United Kingdom	The ship was wrecked on Cape Sable Island, Nova Scotia, British North America. She was on a voyage from Boston, Massachusetts to Pictou, Nova Scotia.
Metis Adler	Norway	The ship was wrecked on Kvitøya. All on board were rescued. She was on a voyage from Norway to Quebec City, Province of Canada, British North America.
Parana	Brazil	The ship was driven ashore on the coast of Puerto Rica. She was on a voyage from Puerto Rica to Rio de Janeiro.
Robert Boak	United Kingdom	The ship ran aground on the Florida Reef. She was on a voyage from Matanzas, Cuba to Queenstown, County Cork. She was refloated on 17 June and taken in to Key West, Florida, United States for repairs.
Seabird	(United Kingdom of Great Britain and Ireland) Victoria	The schooner was wrecked before 24 June.
Seraphine	United Kingdom	The ship was driven ashore near Llanelly, Glamorgan. She was refloated on 4 June and taken in to Swansea, Glamorgan.
Speed	United Kingdom	The ship was severely damaged by ice in the White Sea. She arrived at Arkhangelsk, Russia on 29 June.
S. L. Tilley	United States	The ship was damaged by fire at Savannah, Georgia.
Tanjent	United States	The ship collided with another vessel and was abandoned in the Atlantic Ocean before 27 June.
Urania	United Kingdom	The barque foundered before 4 June. Her crew were rescued by Historia (United Kingdom). Urania was on a voyage from Queenstown to Miramichi, New Brunswick.
