= Caucasian Journey =

Caucasian Journey is a travel book written by the American foreign correspondent Negley Farson, describing his journey in the mountains of the western Caucasus in 1929. Farson undertook the journey in the company of Alexander Wicksteed, a writer and adventurer. It was not until two decades after their expedition that Farson sat down with his notes in order to write the book.

Caucasian Journey was initially published by Evans Brothers in 1951; Doubleday published an American edition as The Lost World of the Caucasus in 1958. Caucasian Journey was reissued by Penguin Books in 1988 under the Penguin Travel Library imprint.

Colin Thubron described the book as a classic, calling it "the record of an unrepeatable journey - adventurous, wry and robustly evocative." Farson's son, Daniel Farson, used Caucasian Journey as the inspiration and motivation for his own journey through Russia, described in A Dry Ship to the Mountains (1994).
