= Baggy Point =

Headland on the north coast of Devon, England

Coordinates: 51.14°N 04.25°W

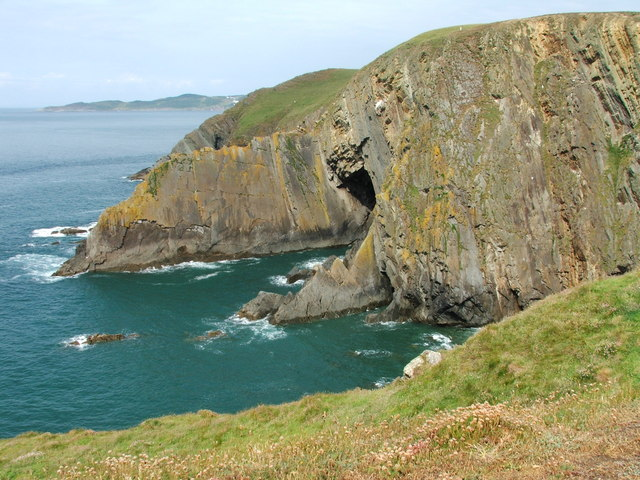

- Location within Devon
- OS grid reference: SS426403
- Shire county: Devon
- Region: South West
- Country: England
- Sovereign state: United Kingdom
- Police: Devon and Cornwall
- Fire: Devon and Somerset
- Ambulance: South Western

Baggy Point is a headland in north Devon, England. It separates Croyde Bay and Morte Bay which includes the beaches of Woolacombe and Putsborough.

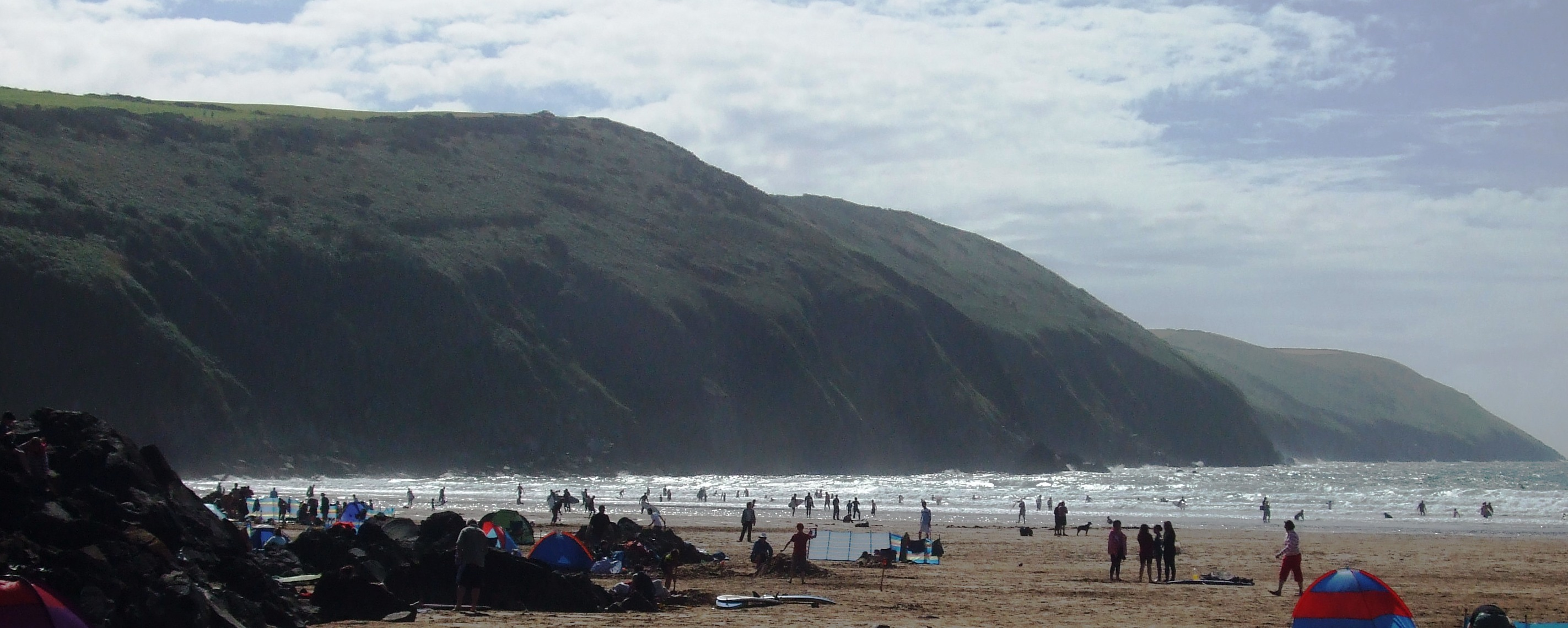
Baggy Point seen from Putsborough beach

There is evidence of human occupation from the Mesolithic era. It was used during World War II by American forces training for the Normandy Landings. The land has been owned by the National Trust since 1939 when it was donated Constance and Florence Hyde.

Baggy Point forms part of the North Devon Coast Area of Outstanding Natural Beauty (AONB) and the Saunton To Baggy Point Coast Site of Special Scientific Interest (SSSI). The SSSI designation is for both geological and botanical interest. The geological interest is in the Upper Devonian Sandstones. The fauna in the rocks is poor but contains bivalves, possibly of brackish to freshwater affinities, and plant remains. The botanical designation is for maritime heathland, grassland and lichens. Lichens which are common in this SSI but unusual elsewhere include Pannaria microphylla, Pannaria nebulosa, Squamarina crassa and the rare Lecania ralfsii.

The birds which can be seen at Baggy Point include guillemots, razorbills, Dartford warblers, stonechats and cormorants. Seals are often seen swimming around the point and the grazing land is used by Hebridean sheep and Ruby Red cattle which have been introduced to keep down the brambles, gorse and bracken. The National Trust have also laid out a variety of walking and cycling trails.

The sandstone rocks are popular with climbers. The climbing routes range in difficulty. Some cannot be accessed at high tide.
