= Morte Bay =

Bay on the northwest coast of Devon, England

Coordinates: 51.161°N 4.222°W

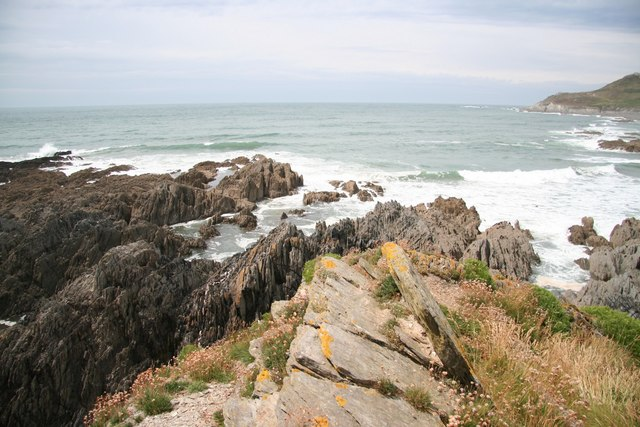
Morte Bay

Map showing the location of Morte Bay within Devon

Morte Bay is a bay on the northwest coast of Devon in southwest England. It stretches from Whiting Hole about 500m north of Baggy Point in the south to Morte Point in the north. At the back of the bay is a long stretch of beach known as Woolacombe Sand though that southern section of the beach which is in the parish of Georgeham is known as Putsborough Sand. The village of Woolacombe is at the northeastern corner of the bay. To its south are the hills of Woolacombe Down and Pickwell Down which provide an eastern backdrop to the beach and the wider bay. The South West Coast Path and Tarka Trail follow the coast around the bay. The cliffs on the northern side of the bay are formed from the Morte Slates whilst those on the southern side are formed from the Upcott Slates. Underlying the bay itself and forming the higher ground to its east are the Pickwell Down Sandstones.
