= Alverdiscott =

Village in Devon, England

Coordinates: 51.008°N 4.111°W

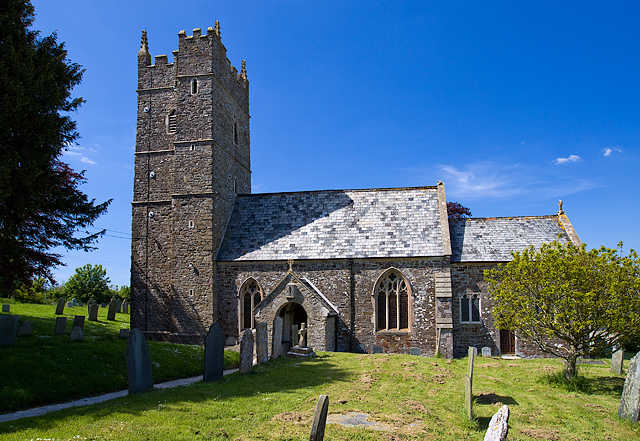
- All Saints Church is medieval with later additions.

- Location within Devon
- Area: 9.57 km^{2} (3.69 sq mi)
- Population: 283 (2021)
  - Density: 30/km^{2} (78/sq mi)
- OS grid reference: SS520253
- Civil parish: Alverdiscott
- District: Torridge
- Shire county: Devon
- Region: South West
- Country: England
- Sovereign state: United Kingdom
- Post town: BARNSTAPLE
- Postcode district: EX31
- Dialling code: 01271
- Police: Devon and Cornwall
- Fire: Devon and Somerset
- Ambulance: South Western
- UK Parliament: Torridge and Tavistock
- Website: Parish Council

Alverdiscott (pronounced Alscott, /ˈɒlskɒt/ or /ˈɔːlskɒt/) is a village, civil parish, former manor and former ecclesiastical parish in the Torridge district of Devon, England, centred 5.5 miles (9 km) south-south-west of Barnstaple. Besides the small village of Alverdiscott, other settlements in the parish include the hamlets of Stony Cross and Woodtown, both to the west. Part of the village nucleus is known as Alscott Barton. The population of the parish at the 2021 census was 283.

== History ==
A scheduled monument is associated with the place, a Roman marching camp fort in the west of the area, on a former Iron Age enclosure. The church is built of granite with sloped slate roofs over the main body (nave) and squatter extension to the nave. It has an archetypal Norman font, Norman doorway, tall tower and sixteenth-century pulpit, and is a Grade II* listed building.

The village has long lost pronunciation of its middle letters yet refused in the Victorian era to adjust its older spelling in favour of a more phonetic modern form except when describing "Alscott Barton", the former demesne of the manor.

The former Manor of Alverdiscott was here, and within the parish is the historic estate of Webbery, listed in the Domesday Book as WIBERIE.

== Governance ==
The first tier of local government is Alverdiscott and Huntshaw Parish Council, a joint council for the two adjacent parishes of Alverdiscott and Huntshaw.

The parish is in Torridge District, and is part of the Two Rivers & Three Moors ward which elects two members of Torridge District Council. It is also part of the Bideford East electoral division which elects one member of Devon County Council. For Westminster elections, Alverdiscott is within the Torridge and Tavistock constituency.

== Transport ==
=== Roads ===
The B3232 skirts the nucleus of the village, the main road between Great Torrington and Barnstaple though not from the town to points east and west of Barnstaple being served by A-roads. Its access is a little further than as the crow files, particularly along roads leading through or around Barnstaple's western suburb and parks; it is close to the direct distance of 4 miles (6.4 km) in the opposite direction from Great Torrington, a town with a major Conservation Area relative to its size.

=== Railways ===
The low daily frequency community railway to North Devon passes in a valley 4 miles (6.4 km) east of the village. It serves the rural request stop of Chapelton which is slightly closer than Barnstaple and can be accessed via footpaths leading up from its steep valley.

== Economy ==
Alverdiscott has settled low unemployment, agriculture, home-working, commuting to Barnstaple and other towns across west Devon. Seasonally, the village generates recreational and tourism-derived income such as from holiday lodges, since the village is south of Barnstaple and east of a tall cliff-side part of the South West Coast Path, Westward Ho! beaches and within easy reach of visitor gardens and golf courses along the River Torridge. An adventure activities centre is to the south at Southdown in the neighbouring parish of Huntshaw.

As of 2022, the connection of the proposed Xlinks Morocco–UK Power Project with the National Grid is planned to be at Alverdiscott.
