= John Harris (1703–1768) =

British landowner and politician

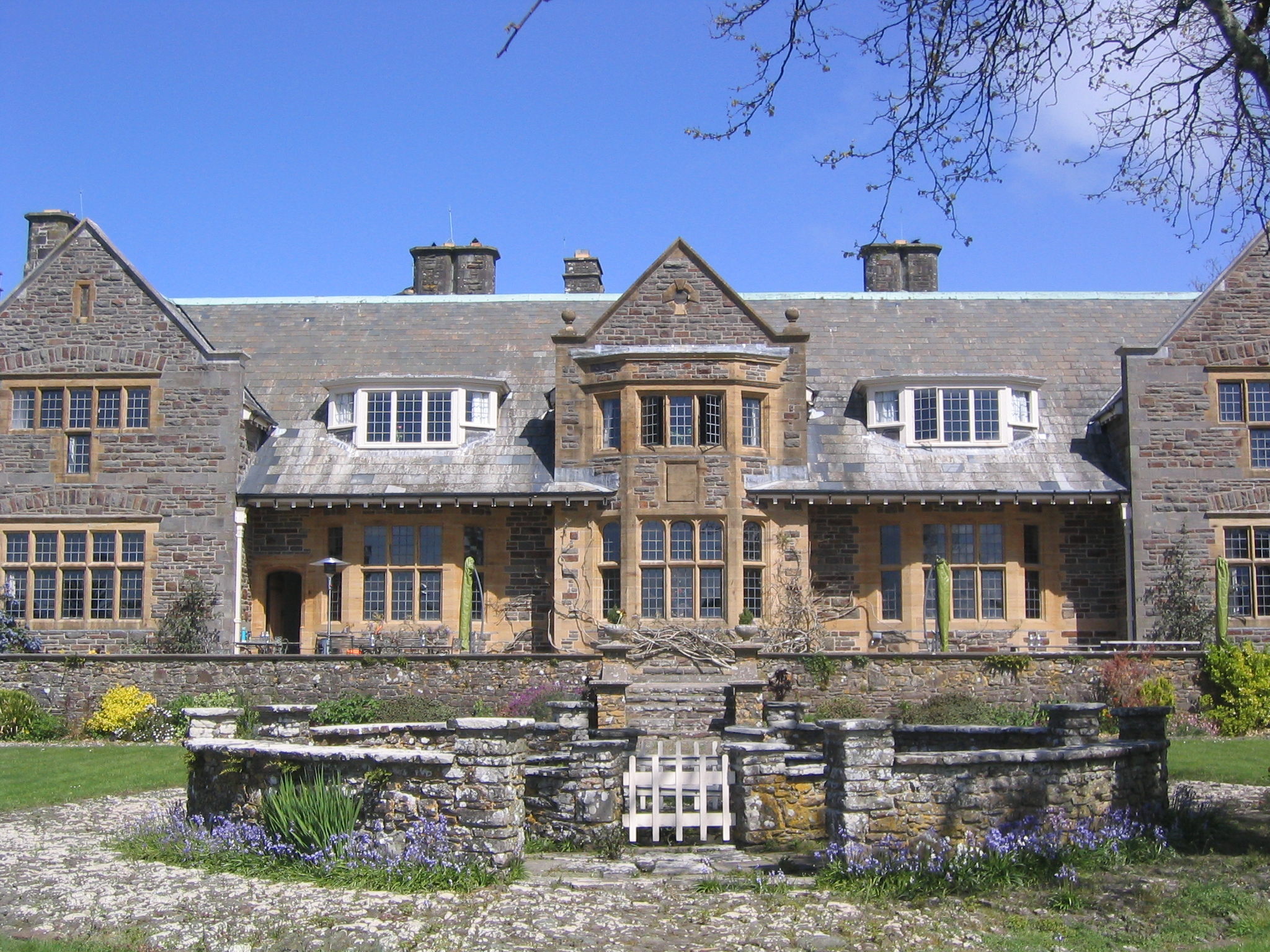
Pickwell Manor

John Harris (6 September 1703 – February 1768) was a British landowner and politician.

He was the son of William Harris of Pickwell Manor near Barnstaple, Devon, which he inherited on the death of his father before 1724.

He was elected in 1741 and again in 1754 as a Member of Parliament for Barnstaple.

He married Dorothy, the daughter of Francis Herbert of Oakley Park, Montgomeryshire, the sister of Henry Arthur, 1st Earl of Powis. They had two sons and two daughters. Pickwell was inherited by his daughter.

Parliament of Great Britain
Preceded by Thomas Benson; Sir Bourchier Wrey	Member of Parliament for Barnstaple; 1754–1761; With: Sir George Amyand	Succeeded by Sir George Amyand; Denys Rolle
