= Daniel Farson =

English writer and broadcaster (1927–1997)

Daniel Farson in 1994

Daniel James Negley Farson (8 January 1927 – 27 November 1997) was a British writer and broadcaster, prominently associated with the early days of commercial television in the UK, when his sharp, investigative style contrasted with the BBC's more deferential culture.

Farson was a prolific biographer and autobiographer, chronicling the bohemian life of Soho and his own experiences of running a music-hall pub on east London's Isle of Dogs. His 1997 memoirs were titled Never a Normal Man.

== Early life ==
Farson was born in Kensington, west London, the son of an American journalist, Negley Farson, and his British wife. His childhood was mostly divided between Britain and North America. He visited Germany with his father while Negley was reporting on the Nazi regime, and was patted on the head by Adolf Hitler, who described him as a "good Aryan boy". Farson briefly attended the British public school Wellington College, whose militaristic regime was not to his taste. He had already become aware of his homosexuality, which caused him great self-loathing. As a teenager he worked as a parliamentary correspondent and was pursued in the House of Commons by the Labour Member of Parliament Tom Driberg.

Farson served for two years with the American army (he had dual nationality), and the G.I. Bill of Rights enabled him to study at Pembroke College, Cambridge; he did not excel academically, but the success of a magazine that he founded there, Panorama, enabled him to get a job as a photographer with Picture Post after graduation. Fired from this job, he worked briefly for Harper's Bazaar before joining the merchant navy.

== 1950s ==
Farson joined Associated-Rediffusion, the first British commercial television company, in 1956. Here he took risks that few television interviewers (certainly not those employed at the then-conservative BBC) would dare to take. In his series Out of Step (1957) and People in Trouble (1958) – never shown at the same time throughout the ITV network, but much repeated in various regions well into the early 1960s – he dealt with issues of social exclusion and alienation that most of the media at the time preferred to sweep under the carpet. The best remembered editions of these series are the Out of Step programme on nudism (the term "naturism" had yet to become commonplace), which claimed to show the first naked woman on British television, and the People in Trouble programme on mixed marriages (a highly sensitive issue at the time as post-war immigrants tentatively began to integrate into British life). They were repeated in 1982 on Channel 4.

Another 1958 Farson series, entitled Keeping in Step, looked at establishment institutions such as public schools from a distinctly more distanced perspective than that seen on virtually all BBC programmes (and even most other Associated-Rediffusion programmes) of the time. A regular guest on Farson's programmes at this stage was James Wentworth Day, a reactionary British writer of the Agrarian Right school, who commented in the programme about mixed marriages, referring to mixed-race children as "coffee-coloured little imps" and argued that black people must be less "civilised" than white people because "their grandfathers were eating each other" (Wentworth Day's remarks were featured in Victor Lewis-Smith's series Buygones and TV Offal). Farson would usually respond to these diatribes with a polite statement along the lines of "I couldn't disagree with you more, but at least you do say what you really feel".

However, Wentworth Day's appearances came to an end when he said all homosexuals should be hanged. Farson insisted that the episode of People in Trouble in which Wentworth Day had made those remarks – concerning transvestism – was scrapped before it had been completed. He publicly insisted that the Independent Television Authority would ban it; in reality Farson was terrified that Wentworth Day would attempt to bring him to trial. After this, Farson immediately froze Wentworth Day out of his life and his programmes.

Farson's broadcasting career, however, continued to flourish. Farson's Guide to the British (1959–1960) took a critical eye at a nation in transition and was the first public expression of his long-term quest for the true identity of Jack the Ripper. Other series included Farson in Australia (1961) and Dan Farson Meets ... (1962), which usually featured popular singers of the time. The one-off programme Beat City (1963) was an atmospheric evocation of the Liverpool scene which had given birth to The Beatles and the sociological factors which had brought it into being. In 1960, he helmed Living For Kicks, a documentary about the frustrations and uncertainties of British teenagers in the Beat Music era, in which Duffy Power was interviewed.

The Daily Sketch, a tabloid paper then owned by Associated Newspapers (who were the "Associated" in Associated-Rediffusion, although they had sold their stake in the company by this time), led the chorus of revulsion to the documentary. The Daily Mirror responded with a defence of British teenagers; a considerable war of words then developed between the two papers, with the Mirror's well-remembered TV commercials ("The Daily Mirror backs the young!") representing its position on the matter.

== 1960s ==
In 1962 Farson made a documentary for Associated-Rediffusion about pub entertainment in the East End of London where he lived, called Time Gentlemen Please (this led directly to the company's later series Stars and Garters, with which Farson was not, however, personally involved). Soon after this he bought a pub, The Waterman's Arms, in the East End with the explicit intent of reviving old-time music hall, but it failed. He later said the money he lost would have been enough to buy a row of houses at the time (1963).

By the end of 1964 he had resigned from Associated-Rediffusion (by then renamed Rediffusion London). He kept a lower public profile for the rest of his life. He moved from London to live in his parents' house in Devon (his father had died in 1960), but continued to make regular visits to the pubs and drinking clubs of Soho.

== 1970s to 1990s ==
Farson became a prolific author and produced several volumes of memoirs. Soho in the Fifties (1987) recalled his participation in the "Bohemia" of Soho. Limehouse Days (1991) recalled his disastrous East End pub venture. These and other books were illustrated with his own photographs.

In 1972, Farson authored Jack the Ripper which proposed Montague John Druitt as a suspect. He wrote a number of studies of artists and authors. The Man Who Wrote Dracula (1975) is a biography of his grand-uncle, Bram Stoker. While living at his father's old house in North Devon Farson established a close friendship with the writer Henry Williamson, an Agrarian Right ally of James Wentworth Day), and later he paid tribute to Williamson with a book, Henry: An Appreciation of Henry Williamson published in 1982, five years after Williamson's death. Sacred Monsters (1988) is a collection of essays on artists and writers he had known.

Farson also wrote the authorised biography of his friend the painter Francis Bacon, The Gilded Gutter Life of Francis Bacon (1994). At Bacon's insistence it was not published until after the artist's death. The 1998 film Love Is the Devil: Study for a Portrait of Francis Bacon starring Derek Jacobi and Daniel Craig draws heavily on the book, showing Farson (played by Adrian Scarborough) socialising with Bacon, as well as interviewing him on television. The film is dedicated to Farson's memory.

His last book was a "portrait" of the artists Gilbert and George, published posthumously in 1999. He had already, in 1991, published an account of a trip he took with them to Moscow.

Farson devised the Channel 4 art quiz Gallery, and he worked as TV critic and, later, art critic for The Mail on Sunday.

He also wrote travel books, including A Traveller in Turkey, The Independent Traveller's guide to Turkey and A Dry Ship to the Mountains (Down the Volga and Across the Caucasus in My Father's Footsteps), the book version of the children's TV series The Clifton House Mystery (produced by HTV West for ITV in 1978), and an appreciation of Marie Lloyd and music hall.

== Final years ==
His father had been an alcoholic, and Farson himself had been a heavy drinker since his days in Soho in the 1950s. In later years the effects of alcoholism became more apparent. He knew he was dying of cancer in March 1997, when his self-deprecating autobiography, Never A Normal Man (a phrase actually used to describe his father, not himself), was published. He was hung over when he appeared on the BBC Radio 4 programme Midweek to promote this book.

He died at his house in Georgeham in Devon on 27 November 1997.

== Publications ==
Magazine

- Panorama - Founded 1949 with Anthony W. West
- No. 5 saw First Combined Issue with Harlequin Spring/Summer 1951

Biography

- Jack the Ripper (1972)
- Marie Lloyd & Music Hall (1972)
- The Man Who Wrote Dracula: A Biography of Bram Stoker (1975)
- Henry: An Appreciation of Henry Williamson (1982)
- With Gilbert & George in Moscow (1991)
- The Gilded Gutter Life of Francis Bacon (1994)
- Never a Normal Man: An Autobiography (1997)

Memoirs

- Soho In The Fifties (1987)
- Limehouse Days (1991)

Cryptozoology and monsters

- Vampires, Zombies and Monster Men (1976)
- Mysterious Monsters (1978) (with Angus Hall)
- The Hamlyn Book of Monsters (1984)

Horror and paranormal

- The Beaver Book of Horror (1977)
- The Hamlyn Book of Ghosts in Fact and Fiction (1978)
- The Hamlyn Book of Horror (1979)
- Curse (1980)
- Transplant (1981)

Travel

- Traveller in Turkey (1985)
- Swansdowne (1986)
- Turkey (1988)
- A Dry Ship to the Mountains (1994)
