= Wowaka discography =

wowaka discography
- Studio albums: 1
- EPs: 3
- Compilation albums: 20 (featured)

The discography of Wowaka consists of one album and three extended plays.

Wowaka began his career in 2009, debuting with the song "In the Gray Zone" (グレーゾーンにて。) He later co-founded the record label Balloom in 2011, and in the same year released his debut album Unhappy Refrain (アンハッピーリフレイン), which placed 6th on the Oricon Charts and is an influential work in the Vocaloid industry. Following this, he formed the band Hitorie as the lead vocalist and guitarist, and continued work there for the rest of his career.

== Albums ==
=== Studio albums ===
List of albums, with selected chart positions
Title	Album details	Peak positions
Title	Album details	JPN
Unhappy Refrain	Released: 18 May 2011; Label: Balloom; Formats: CD, digital download	6
"—" denotes items which did not chart in that region.

=== Mini albums ===
List of albums, with selected chart positions
Title	Album details	Peak positions
Title	Album details	JPN
The Monochrome Disc	Released: 15 November 2009; Label: Hinichijou Records; Formats: CD	—
World 0123456789	Released: 7 February 2010; Label: Hinichijou Records; Formats: CD	—
Seven Girls' Discord	Released: 14 November 2010; Label: Hinichijou Records; Formats: CD	—
"—" denotes items which did not chart in that region.

=== Compilation albums ===
Title	Album details
Exit Tunes Presents Supernova	Released: 2 December 2009; Label: Exit Tunes; Formats: CD; Song featured: Zureteiku (ずれていく)
EXIT TUNES PRESENTS Vocalolegend feat. Hatsune Miku (EXIT TUNES PRESENTS Vocalolegend feat.初音ミク)	Released: 20 January 2010; Label: Exit Tunes; Formats: CD; Song featured: Two-Faced Lovers (裏表ラバーズ, Ura Omote Lovers)
EXIT TUNES PRESENTS Supernova 2	Released: 3 March 2010; Label: Exit Tunes; Formats: CD; Song featured: Rolling Girl (ローリンガール)
LOiD-02 -postrock- LOiD's MiND	Released: 17 March 2010; Label: LOiD; Formats: CD; Song featured: delayed verb
EXIT TUNES PRESENTS Vocalogenesis feat. Hatsune Miku (EXIT TUNES PRESENTS Vocalogenesis feat.初音ミク)	Released: 19 May 2010; Label: Exit Tunes; Formats: CD; Song featured: Rolling Girl (ローリンガール)
VOCAROCK collection feat. 初音ミク	Released: 21 July 2010; Label: FARM RECORDS; Formats: CD; Song featured: World's End Dancehall (ワールズエンド・ダンスホール)
Niconico Touhou Kenbunroku Genkyokushuu (ニコニコ東方見聞録 原曲集)	Released: 5 January 2011; Label: BinaryMixx Records; Formats: CD; Song featured: World's End Dancehall (ワールズエンド・ダンスホール)
Letters to U	Released: 20 April 2011; Label: Aniplex; Formats: CD; Composer and arranger; Song featured: Kakuseiya (覚醒屋)
"Niconico Touhou Kenbunroku" Utattemita -Cast Vocal shuu- (「ニコニコ東方見聞録」歌ってみた 〜キャストボーカル集〜)	Released: 27 April 2011; Label: BinaryMixx Records; Formats: CD; Song featured: World's End Dancehall (ワールズエンド・ダンスホール)
SUPER VOCALO BEAT	Released: 1 June 2011; Label: Dwango User Entertainment, Inc.; Formats: CD; Song featured: World's End Dancehall (ワールズエンド・ダンスホール)
VOCALOID BEST from Niconico Douga (Red) (VOCALOID BEST from ニコニコ動画 (あか))	Released: 22 June 2011; Label: Sony Music Direct; Formats: CD; Song featured: World's End Dancehall (ワールズエンド・ダンスホール)
V.I.P Append(Marasy plays Vocaloid Instrumental on Piano)	Released: 27 July 2011; Label: Dwango; Formats: CD; Song featured: World's End Dancehall (ワールズエンド・ダンスホール)
antinotice/hanabira (「antinotice」 /「花弁」)	Released: 17 August 2011; Label: Toy's Factory; Formats: CD; Composer and lyricist; Song featured: antinotice
Hatsune Miku - Project DIVA - extended Complete Collection (初音ミク-Project DIVA- extend Complete Collection)	Released: 9 November 2011; Label: Sony Music Direct; Formats: CD; Song featured: Rolling Girl (ローリンガール), Two-Faced Lovers (裏表ラバーズ, Ura Omote Lovers)
Kaeshi uta (かえしうた)	Released: 30 November 2011; Label: dmARTS; Formats: CD; Song featured: World's End Dancehall (ワールズエンド・ダンスホール)
Hatsune Miku DANCE REMIX Vol.1 (初音ミク DANCE REMIX Vol.1)	Released: 7 December 2011; Label: JVC Kenwood Victor Entertainment; Formats: CD; Song featured: World's End Dancehall (ワールズエンド・ダンスホール)
LOVER"S"MiLE	Released: 22 February 2012; Label: Aniplex; Formats: CD; Composer and arranger; Song featured: EGOiSTIC SHOOTER
TwinTail・TwinGuitar	Released: 9 May 2012; Label: Royal Records; Formats: CD; Song featured: Rolling Girl (ローリンガール)
Hatsune Miku 5th Birthday Best - Impacts - (初音ミク 5thバースデー ベスト〜impacts〜)	Released: 1 August 2012; Label: Dwango; Formats: CD; Song featured: Two-Faced Lovers (裏表ラバーズ, Ura Omote Lovers)
Yuukei Sekai Reconstruction (有形世界リコンストラクション)	Released: 17 October 2012; Label: Pony Canyon; Formats: CD; Song featured: Two-Faced Lovers (裏表ラバーズ, Ura Omote Lovers)
V-box	Released: 31 October 2012; Label: dmARTS; Formats: CD; Song featured: Unhappy Refrain (アンハッピーリフレイン)
Hatsune Miku - Project DIVA - F Complete Collection (初音ミク -Project DIVA- F Complete Collection)	Released: 6 March 2013; Label: Sony Music Direct; Formats: CD; Song featured: Unhappy Refrain (アンハッピーリフレイン), World's End Dancehall (ワールズエンド・ダンスホール)
secret base (Kimi ga Kureta Mono) 12 years after special package (secret base ～君がくれたもの～12 years after special package)	Released: 28 August 2013; Label: Aniplex; Formats: CD; Arranger; Song featured: secret base (Kimi ga Kureta Mono) (Summernoise ver.) (secret base ～君がくれたもの～ (Summernoise ver.)), secret base (Kimi ga Kureta Mono) (those dizzy day ver.) (secret base ～君がくれたもの～ (those dizzy day ver.))
Balloom Best	Released: 25 September 2013; Label: Balloom; Format: CD; Songs featured: Unhappy Refrain (アンハッピーリフレイン), Two-Faced Lovers (裏表ラバーズ), Nichijou to Chikyuu no Gakubuchi (日常と地球の額縁, 'Frame of Everyday Life and the World')
LANDSPACE	Released: 30 October 2013; Label: Aniplex; Formats: CD; Composer, arranger, lyricist; Song featured: Hitori Waratte (ヒトリワラッテ)
HATSUNE MIKU 10th Anniversary Album「Re:Start」	Released: 30 August 2017; Label: Dwango; Formats: CD; Song featured: Unknown Mother Goose (アンノウン・マザーグース)
Ai ga Chikyu Sukuunsa! Datte DEMPAGUMI.inc wa Family Desho (愛が地球救うんさ！だってでんぱ組.incはファミリーでしょ)	Released: 15 April 2020; Label: TOY'S FACTORY; Formats: CD; Composer, lyricist; Song featured: Abnormal Q

== Singles ==
=== Vocaloid singles ===
List of singles uploaded to Niconico Douga under the names wowaka and Genjitsutouhi-P, and the VOCALOID programs that were used.
Title	Year	Notes
"In the Gray Zone" (グレーゾーンにて。, Gray Zone nite) (Hatsune Miku)	2009	First musical work.
"Palm" (テノヒラ, Tenohira) (Hatsune Miku)	2009	Received over 600,000 views.
"Line Art" (ラインアート, Rain Āto) (Hatsune Miku)	2009	Received over 400,000 views.
"Not Letting You Pass" (とおせんぼ, Tosenbo) (Hatsune Miku)	2009	Received over 1,500,000 views.
"My Talent" (僕のサイノウ, Boku no Sainō) (Hatsune Miku)	2009	Received over 600,000 views.
Two-Faced Lovers (裏表ラバーズ, Ura Omote Lovers) (Hatsune Miku)	2009	Sixth work. Received over 8,200,000 views.
"Out of Step" (ずれていく, Zureteiku) (Hatsune Miku)	2009	Received over 1,900,000 views.
"Doll of Building Blocks" (積み木の人形, Tsumiki no Ningyou) (Hatsune Miku, Megpoid)	2009	Received over 1,100,000 views.
"Rolling Girl" (ローリンガール) (Hatsune Miku)	2010	Received over 9,200,000 views.
"World's End Dancehall" (ワールズエンド・ダンスホール) (Hatsune Miku, Megurine Luka)	2010	Received over 21,000,000 views.
"Unhappy Refrain" (アンハッピーリフレイン) (Hatsune Miku)	2011	Received over 9,300,000 views.
"Unknown Mother-Goose" (アンノウン・マザーグース) (Hatsune Miku)	2017	Received over 77,000,000 views. Last Vocaloid song before his death.
