= Out of Step (TV series) =

British documentary television series

Out of Step is a documentary series made by Associated-Rediffusion in 1957, in which presenter Daniel Farson looks for unconventional opinions' – surrounding a particular topical issue. Episodes lasted approximately 16 minutes, and the show was placed at 10.30pm in ITV's Wednesday schedule.

Keeping in Step (1958), also presented by Farson, looked at more conventional attitudes.

== Episode guide ==
(nb. Dates specified are for the London region)

1. Free the Children (TX: 18 September 1957)

Explore A. S. Neill's Summerhill "do-as-you-like" school.

2. Nudism (TX: 2 October 1957)

Visit a nudist colony, and hear why people go there.

3. Mind Over Matter (TX: 9 October 1957)

Good health, happiness and a saner world – that's what Scientology claims to give us.

4. Away With Governments! (TX: 16 October 1957)

Away With Governments! ... and let's all live in a state of complete anarchy – or do they mean chaos?

5. Spiritualism (TX: 23 October 1957)

Is there life beyond the veil? Can the spirits communicate with us after death?

6. No Meat For Dinner (TX: 30 October 1957)

Vegans are super vegetarians. They don't eat drink milk or eat eggs.

7. Down With Marriage (TX: 6 November 1957)

Most people believe marriage to be a sacred institution. Some, however, think it a waste of time – or worse.

8. Tune in to Nature's Radio (TX: 13 November 1957)

With a little black box and a lot of thought, it is possible to grow bigger carrots by remote control – or is it?

9. Build Your Own Body (TX: 20 November 1957)

Men! You can make your torso more so! Here are the muscle men. Look at the movement and progress.

10. Down With Work (TX: 27 November 1957)

Do you like work, or would you like to lead an idle life? Is a tramp's life really a happy one?

11. Witchcraft (TX: 4 December 1957)

Meet a witch and hear about "the wickedest man in the world".

12. The Seventh Day (TX: 11 December 1957)

Practically everything is shut on an English Sunday. The Lord's Day Observance Society are campaigning to make the laws about Sunday even more strict than they are now.

13. One Man Against The World (TX: 18 December 1957)

Harold Steele made his courageous protest against atom warfare. It failed – or did it?

== Production credits ==
- Presenter: Daniel Farson
- Script: Elkan Allan, David Kentish, Daniel Farson, Stanley Craig
- Director: Geoffrey Hughes
- Film edited by: Charles Squires, Bill Morton
