= Negley Farson =

American author and adventurer (1890–1960)

Negley Farson in 1942

James Scott Negley Farson (May 14, 1890 – December 13, 1960) was an American author and adventurer. A renowned fisherman, Farson wrote one of the classics of fishing literature, Going Fishing. The story of his life is told in his two volumes of autobiography: The Way Of a Transgressor and A Mirror for Narcissus.

== Birth and Childhood ==
Negley Farson Muffed Chance of U. of P. Crew [A 1936 article regarding Farson, published in a Philadelphia newspaper.]
That "Odyssey" of Negley Parson, "The Way of a Transgressor", contains several references to things Philadelphian. At the outset of his picturesque career he was advised that much could be obtained in this life by playing the game of bluff. Apropos of this he pays a tribute to the thoroughness of the courses at the University of Pennsylvania. "It was hardly the right instruction" he writes "to give a young man entering the University of Pennsylvania to become a civil engineer. The Civil Engineering school of that University was no place to play the fool. "Nine o'clock is nine o'clock' was the opening sentence of the draughting professor to his freshman class; 'and five minutes after nine might just as well have been yesterday." "At nine o'clock all the class room doors in the engineering schools closed with a sharp click. And many a morning I stood outside trying to get in." His roving and adventurous spirit found it difficult to adjust itself to collegiate routine and the Spartan code of the physics course, but he took great interest in athletics, in his Freshman year, winning numerals in crew, track and base ball. "One day," he writes, "when I was rowing 7 in the Varsity, the stroke threw a copy of the Philadelphia Evening Bulletin to me. We were in the trolley, going to the river. I read. . . To cap the climax, Farson, a winning member of last year's freshman crew and regarded as a sure candidate for the Varsity Eight, has been declared ineligible. He is behind in his studies in the college department." "That was the way I got one of the worst blows in my life. The fury of Coach Ward cut no ice with the professor of physics. Even the intercession of Mike Murphy was in vain." This was only the prelude to a series of events which finally led him one night to pack up his belongings and leave without attempting to finish his course at Penn or at any other university. His unwillingness to continue long in routine positions is characteristic of his attitude in all the events of his subsequent career at home and abroad. Philadelphians will find greater interest in his works in knowing that Negley Farson, brilliant journalist and author, is James Scott Negley Farson of the Class of 1914 of the University of Pennsylvania.

— ("Principally Philadelphian", Philadelphia Evening Bulletin, 16 September 1936.)

Born on May 14, 1890, in Plainfield, New Jersey at his maternal grandparents' residence, Farson was the son of Enoch S. Farson (1858–1928) and Grace Negley Farson (1871–1950). He had a younger brother, Enoch (born 1892). Farson was raised in his early years by his maternal grandfather, the notorious and eccentric American Civil War veteran General James Negley, of whom it was written that he ‘made other men look like mongrel dogs.’ James Negley added Negley to Farson's name, apparently to make him his heir.

When James Negley died, his house was repossessed because there was no money to cover his debts. Farson was educated at Andover and at Chester (PA) High School. He only went to live with his parents after his grandfather's death in 1901 and his expulsion from Andover.

Farson read civil engineering at the University of Pennsylvania, but he dropped out of his own accord.

== Writing career ==
In about 1910, he moved to Northern England, where he started work in a factory. He then went into journalism and travelled to Russia, being present in Petrograd the day the Bolshevik Revolution broke out. Farson returned to Britain, joined the RAF and learned to fly. He was posted to Egypt, where his aeroplane crashed, and his leg was badly damaged - an injury that troubled him for the rest of his life.

In the third quarter of 1920, in St. Martin, London, Farson married Enid Eveleen née Stoker (known as Eve, 1893–1961), a nurse who had served during World War I. She accompanied Farson on many (but by no means all) of his international excursions.

Farson returned to the United States, and became a salesman for a Chicago company making heavy trucks. After a couple of years he moved to British Columbia, Canada, where he lived "part of the floathouse community that existed on Cowichan Lake. The attraction of such a life was fishing in 'a paradise' - Vancouver Island's Cowichan River." He then moved to New York, and then became a newspaper correspondent again. Cowichan Lake would later become the setting of Farson's novel The Story of a Lake (1938).

In 1924, Farson became a foreign correspondent for the Chicago Daily News, until 1935. He served in India, Egypt and throughout Europe and went on to become one of the most renowned foreign correspondents of his day, interviewing Gandhi in India, witnessing (January 1932) Gandhi's arrest in Poona, witnessing (July 1934) bankrobber John Dillinger's naked body (in the morgue just after he had been shot down by Hoover's men), and meeting Hitler, who described Farson's blond son, Daniel, as a "good Aryan boy".

During Hitler's rise to power, Farson was in Germany, but by this time he had become an alcoholic, and checked himself into the Clinic of Dr. Bumke. After discharging himself, Farson went to South West Africa (now Namibia) and spent some time in the wilderness of Etosha Pan before moving to Cape Town.

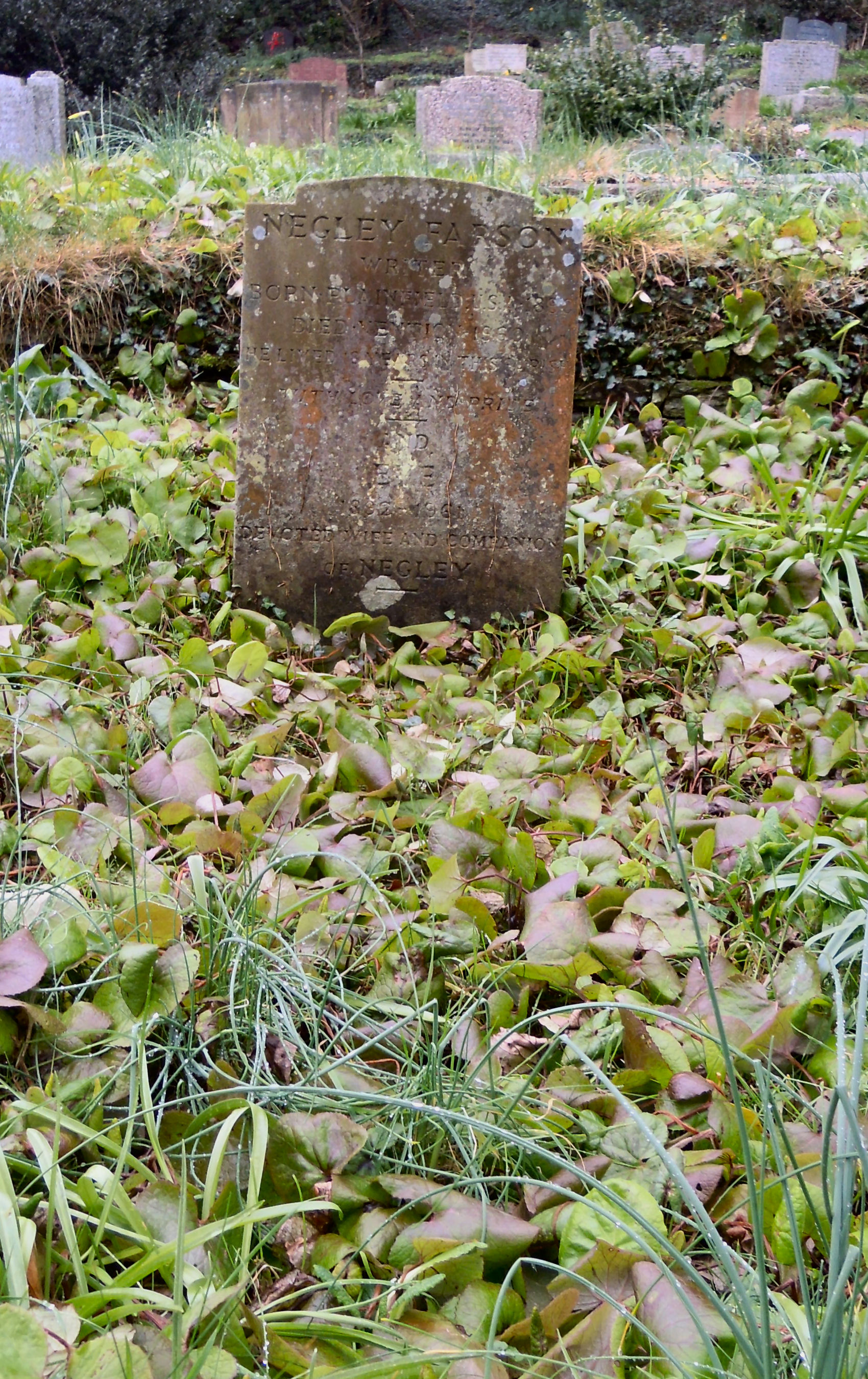
Farson's grave in the churchyard of St George's Church in Georgeham in Devon

== Death ==
Farson died on December 13, 1960, while sitting in an armchair in his home, The Grey House in Georgeham in Devon. He is buried with his wife 'Eve' Farson in the churchyard of St George's Church in the village of Georgeham, near his home. His son, writer and broadcaster Daniel Farson, died in his father's former home in the village.

== Publications ==
- 1926 Sailing Across Europe
- 1930 Black Bread and Red Coffins
- 1936 The Way of a Transgressor
- 1938 Transgressor in the Tropics
- 1939 The Story of a Lake
- 1941 Bomber's Moon
- 1941 Behind God's Back
- 1942 Going Fishing
- 1949 Last Chance in Africa
- 1949 Sons of Noah
- 1951 Caucasian Journey aka The Lost World of the Caucasus (1958)
- 1956 A Mirror for Narcissus
