= Georgeham =

Village in Devon, England

Coordinates: 51.13°N 04.19°W

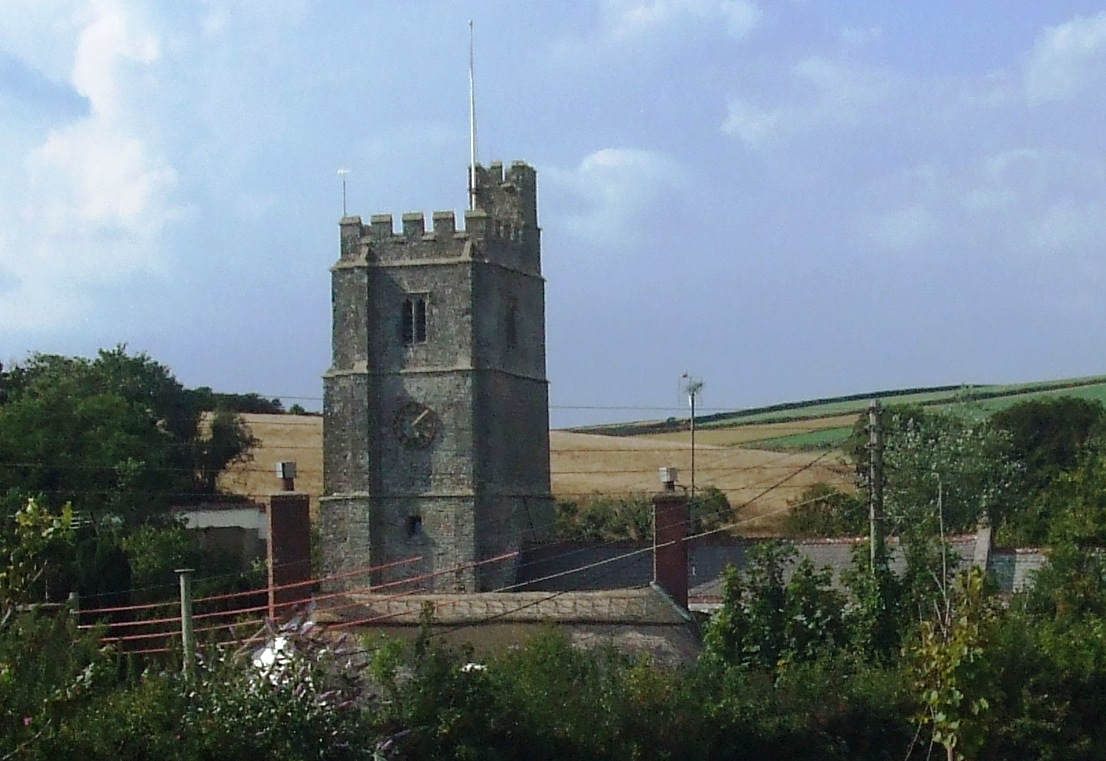
- Georgeham church

- Location within Devon
- Population: 1,487 (2001)
- OS grid reference: SS4639
- Civil parish: Georgeham
- District: North Devon
- Shire county: Devon
- Region: South West
- Country: England
- Sovereign state: United Kingdom
- Post town: BRAUNTON
- Postcode district: EX33
- Dialling code: 01271
- Police: Devon and Cornwall
- Fire: Devon and Somerset
- Ambulance: South Western
- UK Parliament: North Devon

Georgeham is a village and civil parish near Croyde, in North Devon. The population at the 2011 census was 3,748.

Georgeham is a historic village lying close to some of the beaches of the North Devon Coast Area of Outstanding Natural Beauty which are flanked by the rocky headlands of Baggy Point and Saunton Down, although there are no views of the sea or coastline from the village itself. The character of the village is typically rural. The majority of the historic development in the village is east and south-west of the church. The village is also characterized by thatched cottages arranged in an irregular fashion along narrow lanes. There is a Victorian village school, a medieval church and two 17th century public houses.

The village name may be pronounced with an emphasis on both the syllables George and ham, or with no stress on ham, thus making it sound like "George-um".

The hamlets of Cross and Forda lie between Georgeham and Croyde. Pickwell is part of the parish and lies between Georgeham and Putsborough.

== History ==
Georgeham was first documented in the Domesday Book, where it appears under the name Hama. The village's current name, which first appeared in 1535, followed the dedication of St George's church, the parish church, to Saint George. Prior to 1535, the village was also referred to as Ham St. George and George Ham.

The village gave its name to HMS Georgeham, a Ham class minesweeper.

The artist Margaret Kemp-Welch lived in the village during the 1920s and 1930s and painted a mural in the parish church.

After serving in the First World War, Henry Williamson lived in the village from 1921; in Skirr Cottage he wrote his first published work, The Beautiful Years, as well as his most celebrated work, Tarka the Otter. His grave lies in the village churchyard. Also buried here is the writer and adventurer Negley Farson, who also had a home in the village. His son, the writer and broadcaster Daniel Farson, died here in his father's former home in 1997.
