= Manor of Alverdiscott =

Manor in Devon, England

The manor of Alverdiscott was a manor situated in north Devon, England, which included the village of Alverdiscott.

== Descent ==
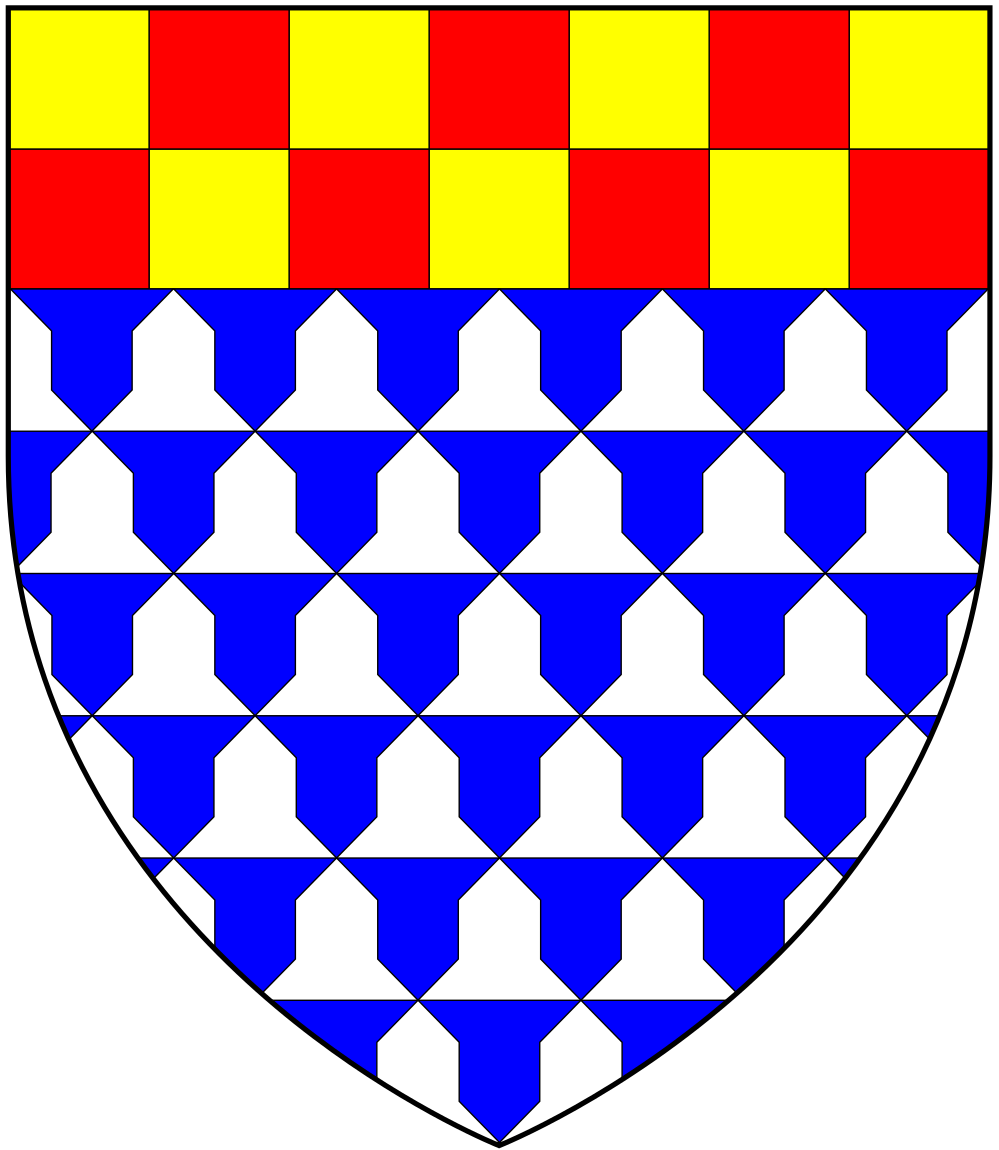
Arms of Fleming of Bratton Fleming, Alverdiscott, etc.

Arms of Bellew

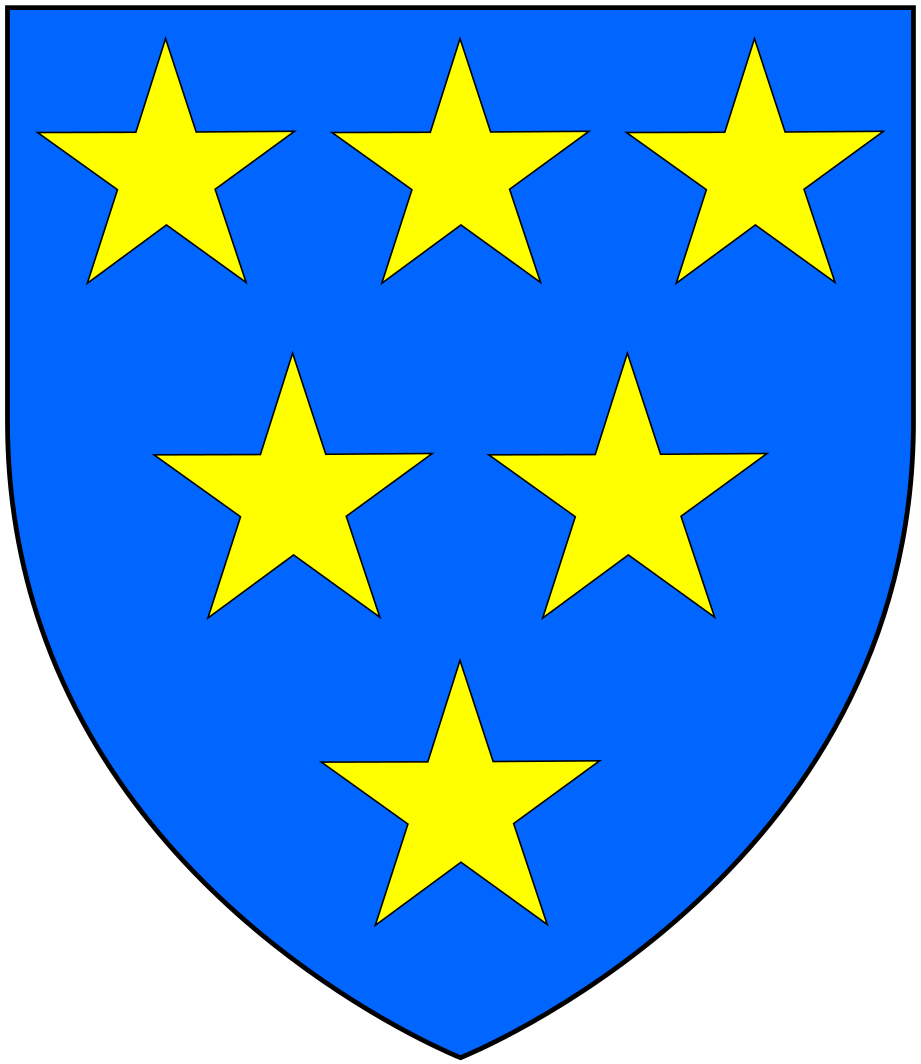
Arms of Welsh

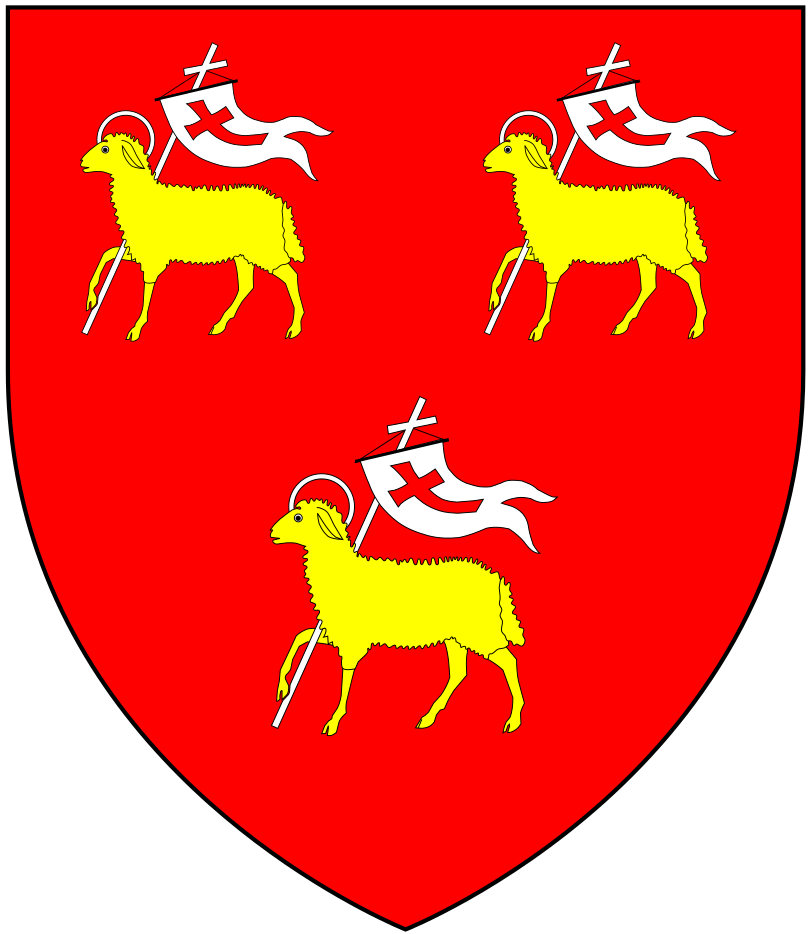
Arms of Rowe of Lamerton in Devon

=== Anglo-Saxons ===
Before the Norman Conquest of 1066 the manor was held by a Saxon named Ordwulf, as is recorded in the Domesday Book of 1086.

=== Domesday Book ===
Alveredescote is listed in the Domesday Book of 1086 as one of the 79 Devonshire holdings of Robert, Count of Mortain. His tenant was Erchenbald, later described as 'Flandrensis', 'le Fleming' denoting "of Flanders".

The lands of Robert, Count of Mortain, became the core holdings of the feudal barony of Launceston, and the Fleming family continued to hold most of their manors from that barony, as can be seen from entries in the Book of Fees.

=== Fleming ===
Erchenbald (or Archibald) le Fleming probably originated in Flanders and the line of descent from him is not precisely documented. He is said to have had a son Stephen (died after 1145), whose son Archibald was on the expedition to Ireland in 1171 and acquired lands there at Slane. He was succeeded by Stephen (died about 1214), whose son is recorded as Baldwin (died 1260).

In the Book of Fees of about 1302, a Baldwin le Flemeng is listed as holding Alverdiscot. His son is recorded as Richard (died 1301), who married Mary, daughter of Sir Nicholas Martin, of Barnstaple. Their son was Baldwin (died 1335), who married Maud, daughter of Sir Simon Geneville, and had a son Simon (died 1370) who married Cecily, daughter of Sir Thomas Champernowne, of Modbury. He was created Baron Slane in the peerage of Ireland.

Alverdiscott then descended to Amy, a granddaughter of Christopher Fleming who died in 1457, and her husband John Bellew.

=== Bellew ===
Alverdiscott became the inheritance of the Bellew family, who appear to have resided at Ash, Braunton, another of the manors inherited from Fleming.

=== Welshe ===
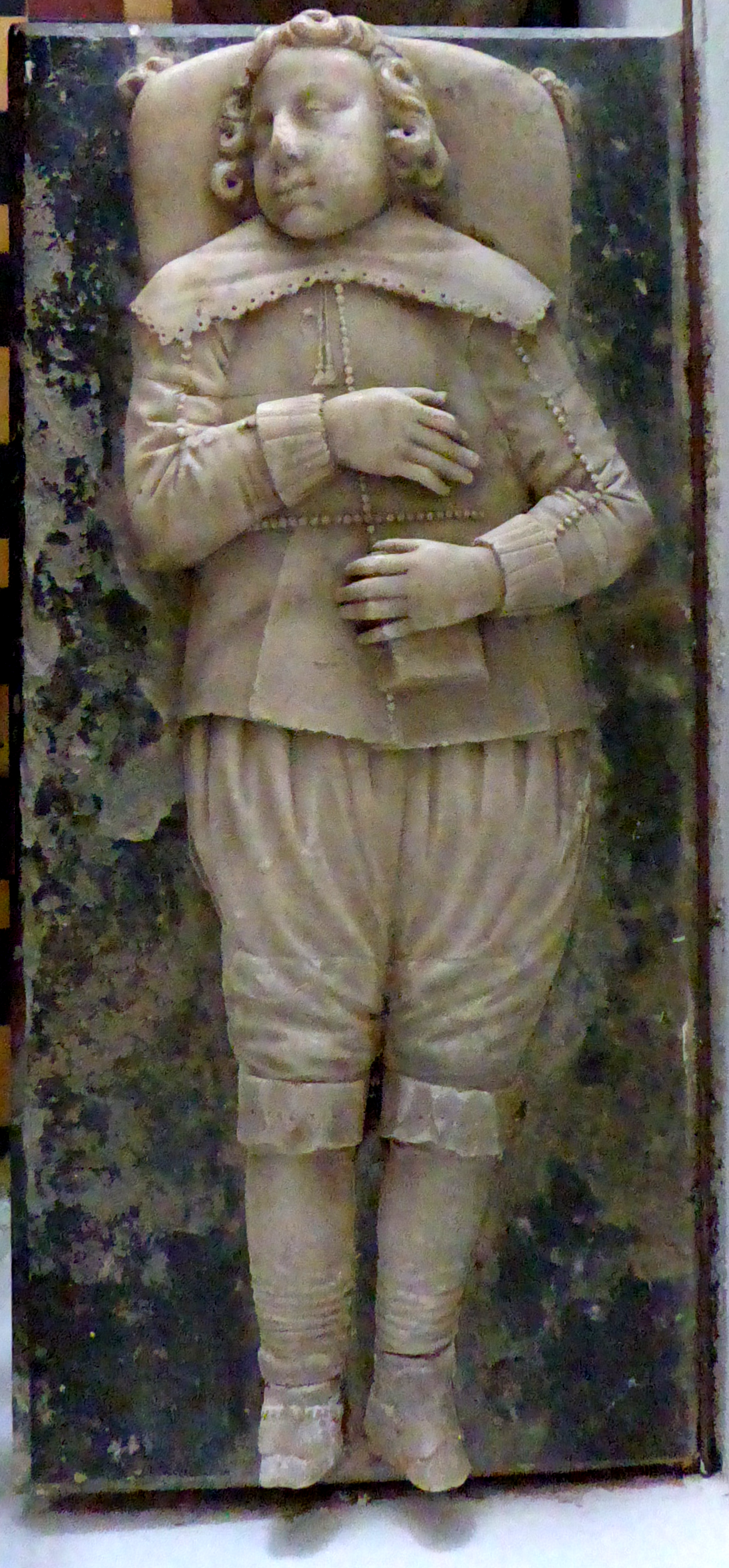
Alabaster effigy of Thomas Welshe (1628-1639) in Alverdiscott Church

The manor was sold by the Bellew family to James Welshe, (alias Walshe), of Barnstaple and Alverdiscott, who according to the Devon historian Tristram Risdon (d. 1640), was a "counsellor of law". James Welshe married four times, firstly to a daughter of the Ridgeway family; secondly at Ashton in 1604 to Anne Pollard, a daughter of Sir Hugh II Pollard, knight, lord of the manor of King's Nympton by his wife Dorothy Chichester (4th daughter of Sir John Chichester (d.1569) of Raleigh, Pilton, Sheriff of Devon and a Member of Parliament) and a sister of Sir Lewis Pollard, 1st Baronet. A small mutilated monumental brass survives in St Peter's Church, Barnstaple, in memory of Anne Pollard. James Welsh married thirdly at Barnstaple in 1623 to Lucy Reynell, fourth daughter of Sir Thomas Reynell (d. 1621) of East Ogwell; and fourthly he married Jane Windham (d.1650), a daughter of Sir Thomas Windham whose monument was said by Lysons in 1822 to have existed in Alverdiscott Church.

By Jane Windham he had a son and heir apparent Thomas Welsh (1629–1639), who died aged 10, whose chest tomb with alabaster effigy survives in Alverdiscott Church. The effigy was described by Nikolaus Pevsner as a "touching, life-size effigy in Van Dyck dress".

James Welshe's heir thus became his daughter (from which marriage is unknown), Elizabeth Welsh, the wife of Sir Arthur Northcote, 2nd Baronet. The marriage produced two sons and one daughter, described on Sir Arthur's ledger stone of 1707 in King's Nympton Church as "deceased".

=== Rowe ===
Shortly before 1810 the manor of Alverdiscott was the residence of James Rowe (d.1785). He was probably the son of William Rowe of Southfields Plantation in Jamaica, and of Tavistock in Devon. According to Lysons (1822) this family was a junior branch of the Devonshire gentry family of Rowe of Lamerton, 3 miles north-west of Tavistock, a member of which was the Poet Laureate Nicholas Rowe (1674-1718), whose son was the last in the senior male line. The Rowe family is first recorded in Jamaica in the early 1700s as substantial plantation owners. The 1754 Quit Rent Books in Jamaica record James Rowe as owning 2,709 acres in St Elizabeth parish. He married Mary Allan of Jamaica. in the mid-1750s he left his two sons in charge of his plantations and retired to England, having inherited his paternal estates in Devon. In 1756 he purchased an estate in the parish of Alverdiscott and in 1760 acquired the manor of Alverdiscott and the advowson of the parish church. In the early 1780s he leased for one year his plantations in Jamaica to John Pine of East Down in Devon. He died in 1785 leaving a son and heir William Rowe (d.1785), who died shortly after his father. The will of "James Rowe of Great Torrington" was proved on 7 September 1785 and recited that he had previously conveyed his estates in Jamaica and Devon to his son William Rowe. He mentioned the "small pittance" he had reserved for his other children, namely Rev. John Rowe, Judith Rowe and Mary Rowe. Alverdiscott was the inheritance of his eldest son William Rowe. In 1800 the nephew of James Rowe sold the manor of Alverdiscott to Richard Preston, MP, who still owned it in 1822, in which year Rev. John Rowe was Rector of Alverdiscott, and the son of his elder brother still resided in Jamaica.

=== Preston ===
The manor was purchased shortly before 1810 by Richard Preston (1768–1850) of Lee House in the parish of Chulmleigh, Devon, a lawyer of the Inner Temple, a leading authority on the law of real property and a Member of Parliament for Ashburton in Devon 1812-1818, a pocket borough under the patronage of Robert Cotton St John Trefusis, 18th Baron Clinton (1787–1832) of Heanton Satchville, Petrockstowe in Devon. He still owned the manor in 1822. He was the only son of Rev. John Preston of Okehampton in Devon and in 1794 he married Catherine Marsh of Bideford, by whom he had 2 sons and 5 daughters. Having made a fortune from his legal career he "invested heavily in Devonshire landed property". He wrote in his will dated 12 August 1836: "the ample estate I have acquired has not been obtained without a devotion to my profession which has been rarely surpassed". However, he went on to say that his fortune "was far less than might have been expected from the income of 40 years disclosed in his fee books, but that he was better satisfied with the sacrifices he had made than to have oppressed a tenantry who in general are meritorious and have suffered by low prices".
