= Croyde =

Village in Devon, England

Coordinates: 51.133°N 4.217°W

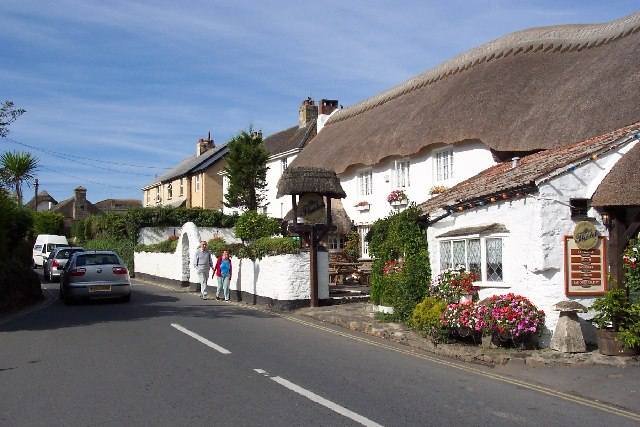
- Croyde

- Location within Devon
- Population: 614
- OS grid reference: SS4439
- Civil parish: Georgeham
- District: North Devon
- Shire county: Devon
- Region: South West
- Country: England
- Sovereign state: United Kingdom
- Post town: BRAUNTON
- Postcode district: EX33
- Dialling code: 01271
- Police: Devon and Cornwall
- Fire: Devon and Somerset
- Ambulance: South Western
- UK Parliament: North Devon

Croyde is a village on the west-facing coastline of North Devon, England. The village lies on the South West Coast Path near Baggy Point, which is owned by the National Trust. It lies within the North Devon Coast Area of Outstanding Natural Beauty.

Croyde village and its beach is on the Bristol Channel. The beach faces westwards toward the Atlantic Ocean, which begins at Hartland Point some 22 miles in the distance.

Croyde Stream runs through the village, eventually leading to the beach. The centre of the village is roughly at the intersection of Hobbes' Hill, Jones' Hill and St. Mary's Road. At this spot, Croyde Bridge carries the road over the stream.

Public services are provided by the North Devon District Council (NDDC) based in Barnstaple. The village is in the civil parish of Georgeham, and for ecclesiastical purposes within the Diocese of Exeter.

== Today ==
The village has several small campsites, a small retail area and two large holiday parks; Croyde Bay Holiday Resort (operated by UNISON) and Ruda Holiday Park, operated by Parkdean Resorts until recently but now run by John Fowler Holiday Parks.

The past 30 years have seen large increases in younger-age visitors developing around surfing. The impact of tourism on the village has been varied. Some local landowners have benefited from the increased property prices. Tourism has helped to create jobs that were lost in agriculture. Local farming has declined, with former farmland converted into caravan sites and fields for seasonal camping. Like many seaside villages, the phenomenon of second homes has pushed house prices beyond the reach of most local people. There is little year-round employment, because tourism is seasonal, and most businesses are closed out of season.

Since 1999, Croyde has hosted an annual surfing and music festival (GoldCoast Oceanfest) on the weekend closest to the summer solstice.

Croyde has also benefitted from the 'street food revolution,' being the hometown of Lola's Wings, which has a pitch there, and other visiting street food trucks and trailers.

During the summer season, an outdoor market is held every Tuesday in a field off Moor Lane, past Ruda Holiday Park and heading towards Baggy Point.

== History ==
Croyde supposedly takes its Celtic name from the Viking raider Crydda. However, others have speculated that as the word is similar to the Cornish word 'Curd' that describes the geographical position of the village resting amongst a cradle of hills, it could also have taken its name from this. There is evidence of a settlement that dates before the Saxon Period though, so the correct name is unclear.

Croyde is mentioned in the Domesday Book as Crideholde / Crideholda: Erchenbald from Robert, Count of Mortain. 11 cattle and 100 sheep were recorded in the Domesday Book at Crideholde / Crideholda (Croyde) in 1086.

In the Medieval Period, there was a market sited at Croyde, most likely near the centre of the village where Jones' Hill, Hobbs' Hill, and St Mary's Road meet.

During World War II, in 1943, the hamlet was commandeered by American soldiers who practised manoeuvres for the D-day landings. Most training took place on Saunton Sands/Braunton Burrows. After the war, Croyde returned to being a predominantly holiday resort.

In the 60s, about 150 meters south east of Withywell Lane, a Royal Observer Corps (ROC) bunker was constructed due to rising tensions with the Soviet Union and the need to watch the skies all over the UK for Soviet planes and or nuclear bombs / missiles. The bunker was decommissioned in the 90s after the end of the Cold War and now sits in disrepair.

== Religious sites ==
Croyde has an Anglican church, St Mary Magdalene which holds services at 9am the first three weeks of each month, and has hosts an early morning service on Croyde beach on Easter Sunday.

Croyde also has a Baptist chapel which is open on Sundays at 11 am.

== Transport ==
The nearest railway station is Barnstaple, 10 miles (16 km) away. From Monday to Saturday, there is an hourly bus service to Croyde from Barnstaple, with a two-hour frequency on Sundays.

Road transport from the M5 motorway is 47 miles (76 km) via the A361 trunk road.

Ferry services operate between Ilfracombe, roughly around 10–20 miles away, and Lundy Island.

The nearest airport to the village is Exeter International Airport, the second-closest being Bristol International.

== Education ==
Croyde has no education resources in the village. Children have access to Georgeham Primary School; secondary education is provided by Braunton Academy.

== Beach ==
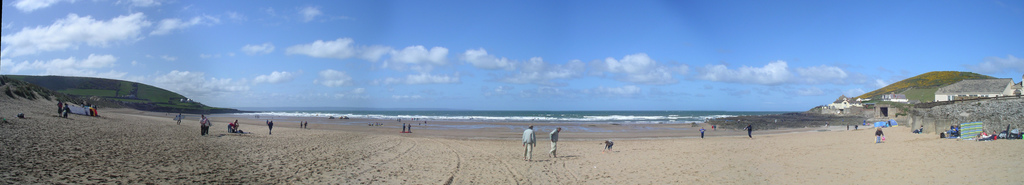
Panorama of Croyde Beach

The sandy 875-yard (800 m) beach, which as of 2022, holds 'Blue Flag' status, lies at the back of the sheltered Croyde Bay. A large dune system has formed past the high-tide mark. Sand underlies the land surface between the beach and the centre of Croyde village, 600 yards (550 m) to the east. The beach forms the middle section of a trio of sandy beaches north of the Taw Estuary. Three-and-three-quarter-mile-long (6.0 km) Saunton Sands is 2/3 mile (1.1 km) to the south, and 1.8-mile-long (2.9 km) Woolacombe Sands, divided into Putsborough and Woolacombe beaches, is 0.93 miles (1.50 km) to the north. Barbecues and contained fires are not permitted on Croyde beach.

Croyde is used for surfing; the rides are generally short as the waves tend to pitch up and break quickly. There is a point break off Down End. There is a reef break at the northern (Baggy Point) end of the beach that works for about 60 minutes during some high tides. The shape of the bay funnels waves towards the beach. The beach is also steeper than either Woolacombe, Putsborough or Saunton Sands. Due to this, rip currents are extremely strong especially near the rocks at either end of the beach or at low tide, even when there is only a small swell. These currents present danger to the strongest of swimmers. Any bathing should be done within the lifeguard-patrolled area. The break is very compact at low tide, resulting in many injuries.
