= North Devon Coast =

Area of Outstanding Natural Beauty in England

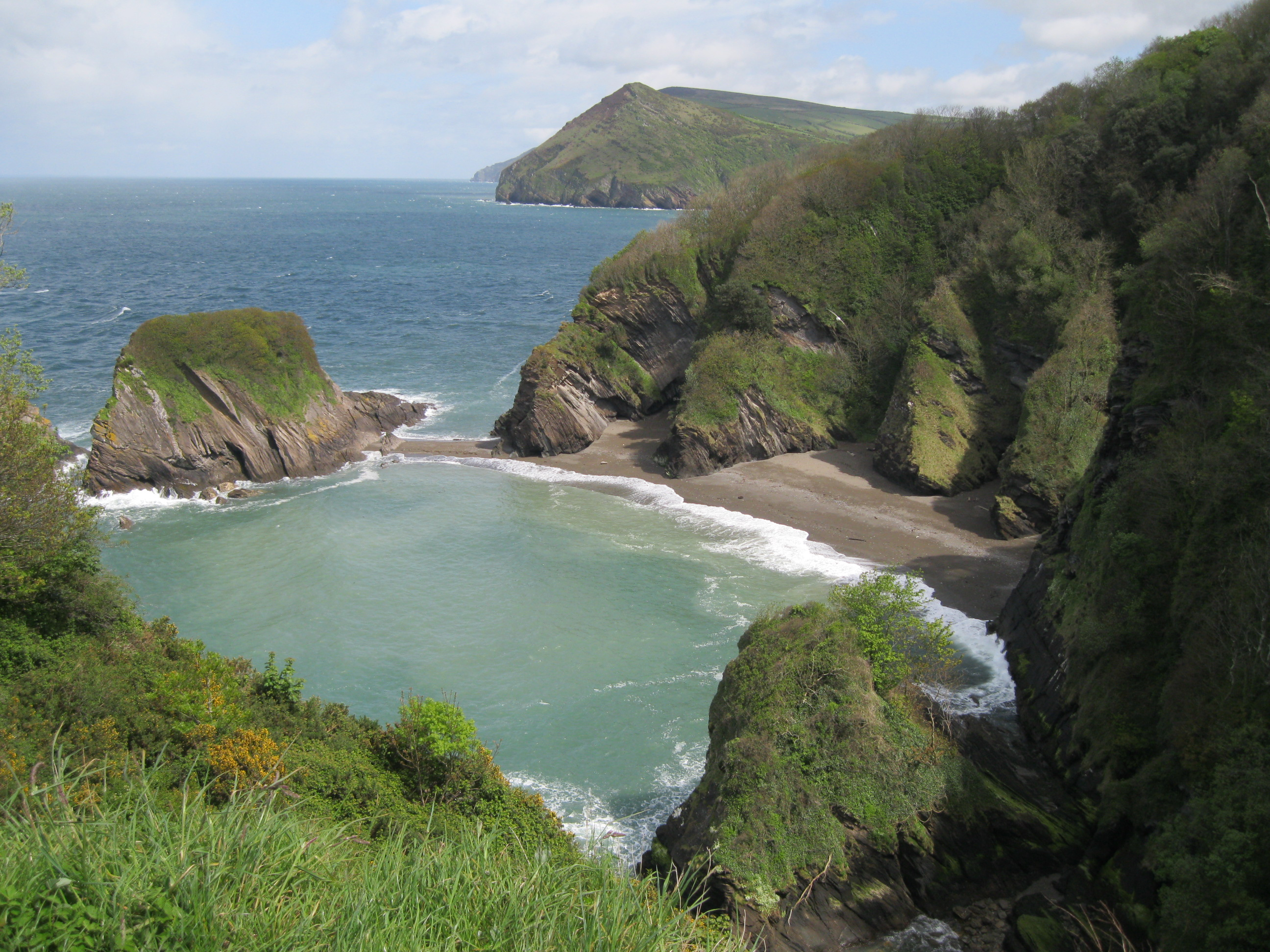
Watermouth Cove near Watermouth Castle

The North Devon Coast is a designated Area of Outstanding Natural Beauty in Devon, England, designated in September 1959. The AONB contributes to a family of protected landscapes in the Southwest of England and a total of 38% of the region is classified by the International Union for Conservation of Nature as Category V Protected Landscapes. The twelve Areas of Outstanding Natural Beauty extend to 30% of the region, twice the proportion covered by AONBs in England as a whole and a further two National Parks, Dartmoor and Exmoor, cover an additional 7%.

The North Devon Coast AONB covers 171 square kilometres (66 sq mi) of mainly coastal landscape from the border of Exmoor National Park at Combe Martin, through the mouth of the Taw & Torridge Estuary to the Cornish border at Marsland Mouth. The dune system at Braunton Burrows forms the core area of North Devon's Biosphere Reserve, the first "new style" Unesco-designated reserve in the United Kingdom. The whole of the AONB is within the Reserve boundaries.

== Overview ==
The North Devon Coast was first considered to require some form of national landscape protection in 1953 and was originally intended to be part of the Exmoor National Park. The Torridge section was to be part of the proposed Cornwall Coast National Park. This was not to be, and by 1956 Devon County Council had agreed that the North and South Devon Coasts should be considered as AONBs.

The National Parks Commission were asked to draw up a proposed boundary to submit to the County Council and there was consultation with the Urban and Rural District Councils concerned. Initially, it was proposed that most of Combe Martin village be excluded because of bad disfigurement by electricity and telephone cables. The suggested boundary largely followed the Area of Special Landscape Value, which was a County Council designation. There followed a period of consultation and modification e.g. Northam Burrows was added. Following public advertisement only one representation was received; this was from a resident concerned about his proposal to develop a holiday camp at Watermouth. Ultimately, in September 1959, the North Devon AONB was the first AONB in Devon to be designated and confirmed in May 1960, just two months ahead of South Devon.

For many years, the AONB had no specific management service, however in the early 1990s, a Heritage Coast Service managed the two defined Heritage Coasts which have similar boundaries to the AONB. In 2002 Braunton Burrows, within the AONB, was re-designated as the core of a Biosphere Reserve under the revised UNESCO Man and the Biosphere Programme, providing international recognition for the area. This was closely followed by the establishment of the North Devon AONB Partnership in 2004 with a small staff unit to support it. There is a close relationship between the AONB management and that of the North Devon UNESCO Biosphere Reserve with reciprocal partnership membership.

== Geography ==
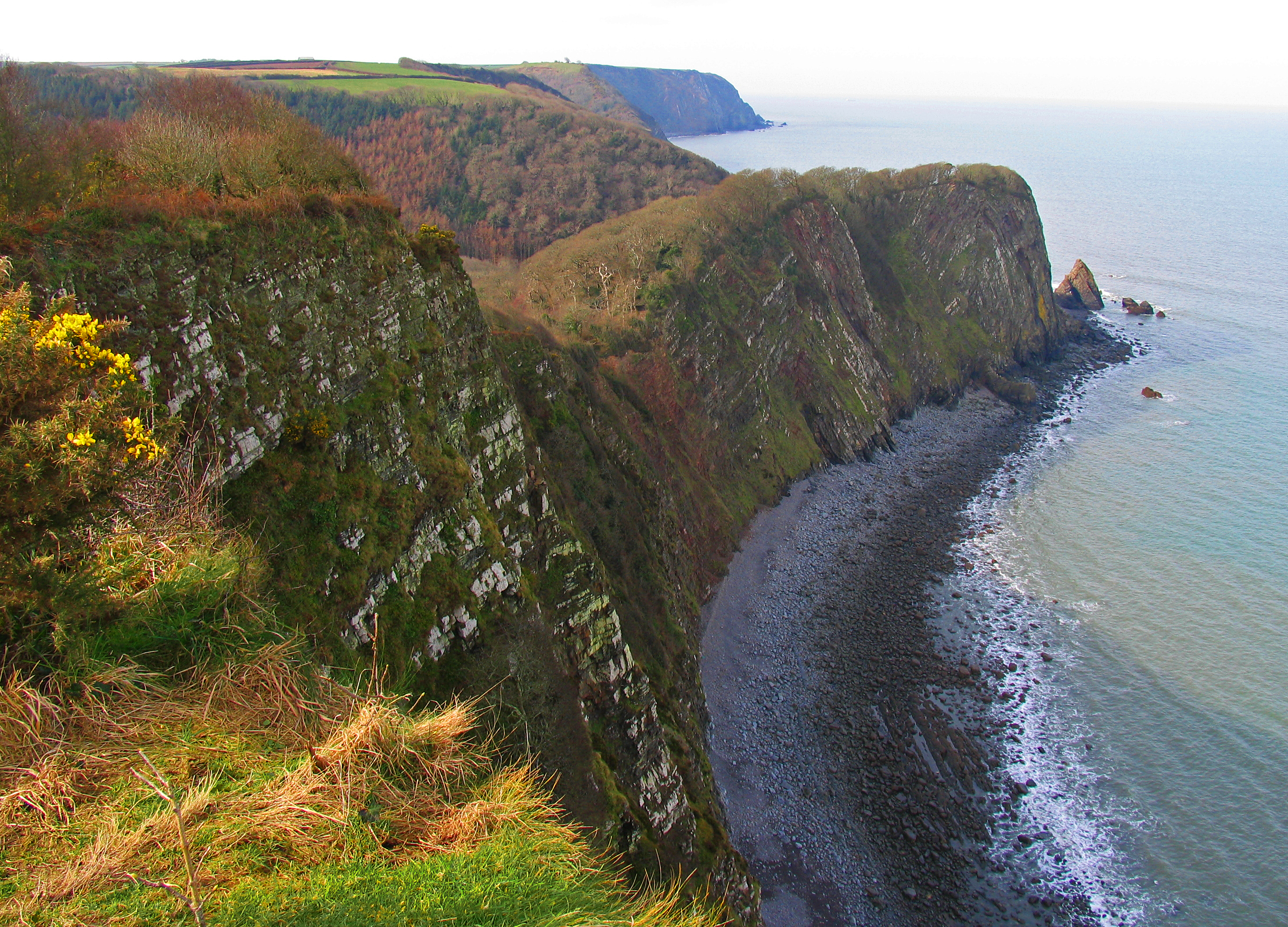
Cliffs - Clovelly Coast

The North Devon AONB contains a diversity of scenery including tall, rugged cliffs, wave-cut platforms, wide sandy bays, sand dunes, traditional hedged fields with wind sculptured trees, steep-sided wooded combes and woodland that runs right to the cliff edge. Encompassed within the designated area is the dramatic coastline of the Hartland promontory, the calm tranquillity of Bideford Bay, the internationally important conservation sites that flank the Taw and Torridge Estuary, the striking headlands and golden beaches of the North Devon Downs and the secluded coves and bays of the North Devon High Coast. North Devon's coastline face the Atlantic Ocean and the Bristol Channel.

In 2006-7 Devon County Council, in partnership with Natural England, the Devon AONBs and other local authorities, commissioned a study of the North Devon landscape. As a result, the AONB has been classified into 11 Landscape Character Types.

=== Open coastal plateaux ===
Found along the Atlantic Coast between Bude and Ilfracombe, frequently interrupted by lower-lying landscape types, especially between Westward Ho! and Woolacombe. This type is characterised by dense low hedges (often elm) with occasional hedgerow oaks, little woodland, few roads but many rights of way, very low settlement density, influence of geology on land form, and extensive views along the coast.

=== Farmed lowland moorland ===
Lying inland from Hartland Point, between Clovelly and Welcombe, this landscape type is characterised by very flat moorland, predominantly inland character with small coastal fringe, pastoral cultivation with dominant conifer plantations, notably regular field patterns with areas of unenclosed moorland heath and scrub, shallow streams and rush-dominated roadside ditches indicative of impeded drainage, sparse settlement pattern of hamlets and isolated farms with some tourism and leisure uses, and a sparse highway network of narrow straight lanes.

=== Scarp slopes ===
Mainly at intervals along the western Atlantic coast to the south of Hartland Point this landscape type is characterised by narrow, steep individual or multiple branching valley systems, dense woodland, predominantly with broadleaf trees, small areas of pasture and scrub with irregular small-scale field patterns marked by low hedgebanks, extremely sparsely settled with stone as dominant building material, limited or absent road network, limited vehicle access to coast and coastal rights of way, and scattered with tranquil and remote enclosed in combes.

=== Settled coastal slopes and combes ===
Facing north to the Atlantic around Ilfracombe and Clovelly this landscape type is characterised by steeply sloping narrow valley systems, a mix of unenclosed woodland and small to medium irregular fields with wide hedgebanks, pasture with frequent wet pasture and horse paddocks, extensive linear settlement just above narrow, flat valley floor, with Victorian architecture and small scale 20th Century ‘resort’ development, sparse winding narrow lanes, and lush vegetation.

=== Steep open slopes ===
This west-facing coastal type between Morte Point and Braunton, overlooking series of sandy beaches, is characterised by sloping hillside adjoining but not part of coastal cliffs, open pastoral farmland without woods or trees but with low hedges and hedgebanks, mix of pasture, rough grazing and low scrub, regular field patterns of variable size, limited network of minor roads, smallscale hamlets of vernacular style or extensive coastal settlements with much leisure-related development, and extensive coastal views

=== Valley slopes ===
These small areas above the beaches and dunes at Croyde and Braunton are characterised by their gently rolling landform sloping up from valley floor, small fields with medium to tall boundaries, a variety of building ages, styles and settlement size, much leisure-related development with strong influence of coastal or marine activities, much use of stone, winding narrow lanes, streams, and largely tranquil out of season.

=== Valley floors ===
Related to the Braunton Great Field and Braunton Marsh, this landscape type is set back from the river Taw to the south and protected from westerly maritime influence by Saunton Sands and Braunton Burrows. Its key characteristics include; open flat landform, often with distinct vegetated floodplain edge, shallow watercourses screened by riparian vegetation, pastoral or arable land use with variable field sizes, rare survival of medieval open field strip system (Braunton Great Field), unenclosed or with stone walls and hedges as well as drainage ditches, unsettled, narrow winding lanes, open internally with views out screened by boundary vegetation, estuarine or river valley character and exceedingly tranquil.

=== Unsettled marine levels ===
Predominantly centred on the Skern mudflats on the southern flank of Taw/Torridge estuary this character type is distinguishable as a flat unsettled river valley, with marine influence on terrestrial habitats. Its proximity to roads and settlements in adjoining areas reduces tranquillity, however it retains traditional floodplain habitats and a high level of biodiversity.

=== Inter-tidal sands ===
Either side of the Taw Torridge estuary mouth and further north along the north-western Devon coast (Woolacombe, Putsborough, Croyde, Saunton and Westward Ho! beaches this landscape type is characterised by enormous flat sandy beaches, extensive recreational use, a protected by pebble ridge, low rocks, cliffs and dune systems, unenclosed, unsettled and without roads, good access but few footpaths and with extensive views along the coast.

=== Coastal dunes ===
Along the north-western Devon coast, to the east of extensive beaches and characterised by its extensive dune systems, this landscape type has been recognised as internationally important for its biodiversity. Other characteristics include extensive recreational use, some rush-dominated pasture, almost entirely unsettled and without roads and is open but not exposed except along western edge.

=== Cliffs ===
To the north and west coasts of North Devon, excluding the Taw-Torridge estuary, this landscape type demonstrates near-vertical, steeply sloping cliffs which remain largely inaccessible. Scattered with narrow shingle beaches, small stony coves or rocky foreshore at foot of cliffs, these areas are only accessible along the cliff top via the South West Coast Path where there are also extensive views along the coastline.

== Wildlife ==
The landscapes of the North Devon AONB encompass a good habitat resource for wildlife. These include the culm grasslands around Hartland, the coastal woodlands near Clovelly, the heathlands around Hartland and Morte Point and the extensive sand dune systems at Braunton and Northam Burrows. From the floral orchids of the sand dunes, the bluebells of the coastal combes, to the birds and insects of the coastal heaths these varied habitats support a rich variety wildlife. The AONB also contains a wealth of historic and archaeological sites with buildings and old field patterns that reflect the progress of man from pre-historic times to the present day.

== Community and economy ==
Approximately 12,000 people live within the AONB, the largest settlements being Combe Martin and Hartland. Other well known villages include the picturesque villages of Clovelly, Berrynarbor, and Croyde. The larger settlements of Ilfracombe, Bideford and Braunton lie on the very edge of the designated area and provide 'gateway' towns into the AONB. The economy of the AONB is dominated by agriculture and tourism which has had a major influence on the landscape of the area.

== See also ==
- Braunton Burrows
