= Mortehoe Museum =

Museum in Devon, England

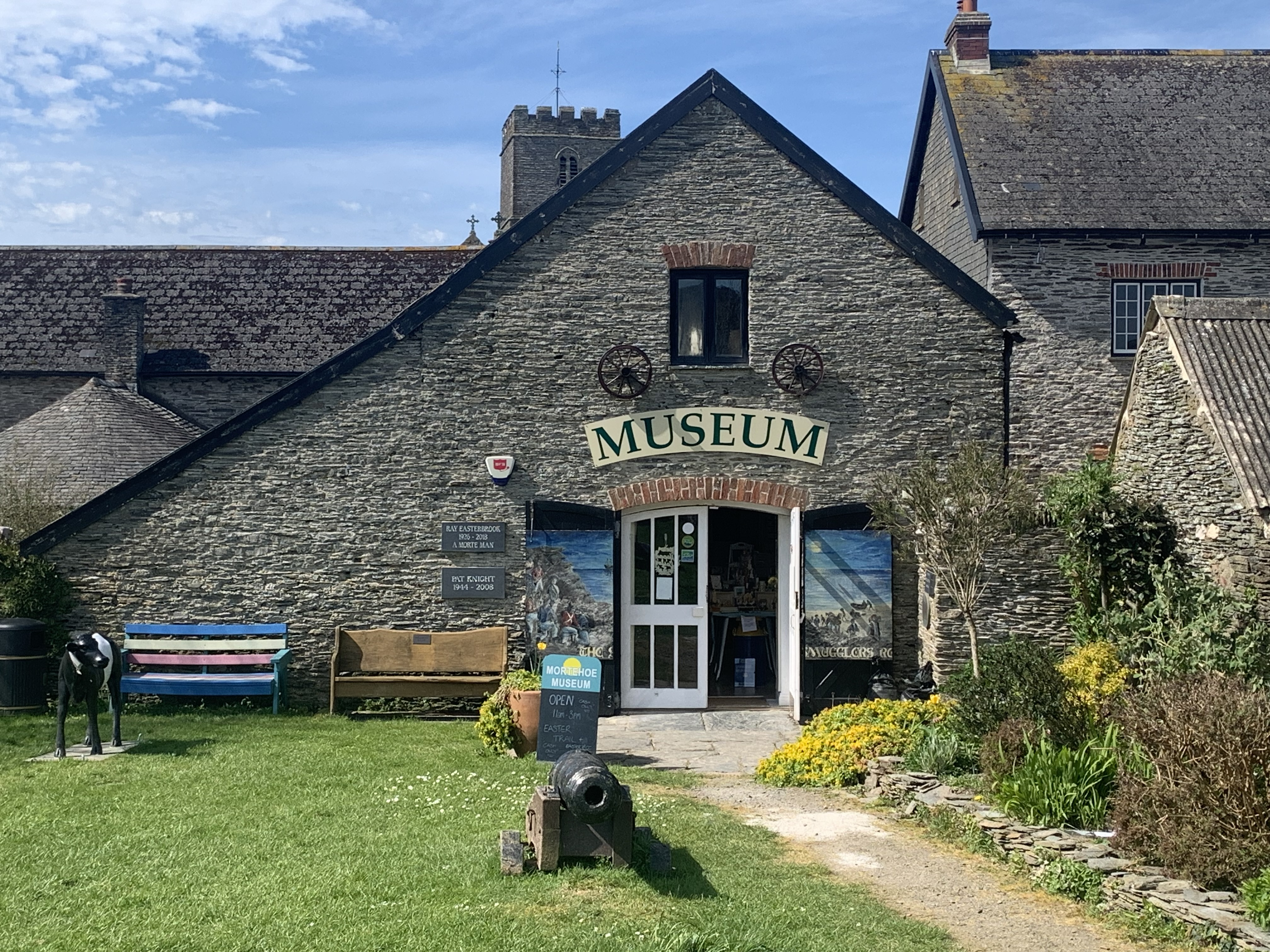
- The Mortehoe Museum
- Location: Mortehoe, Devon
- Coordinates: 51°11′06″N 4°12′31″W

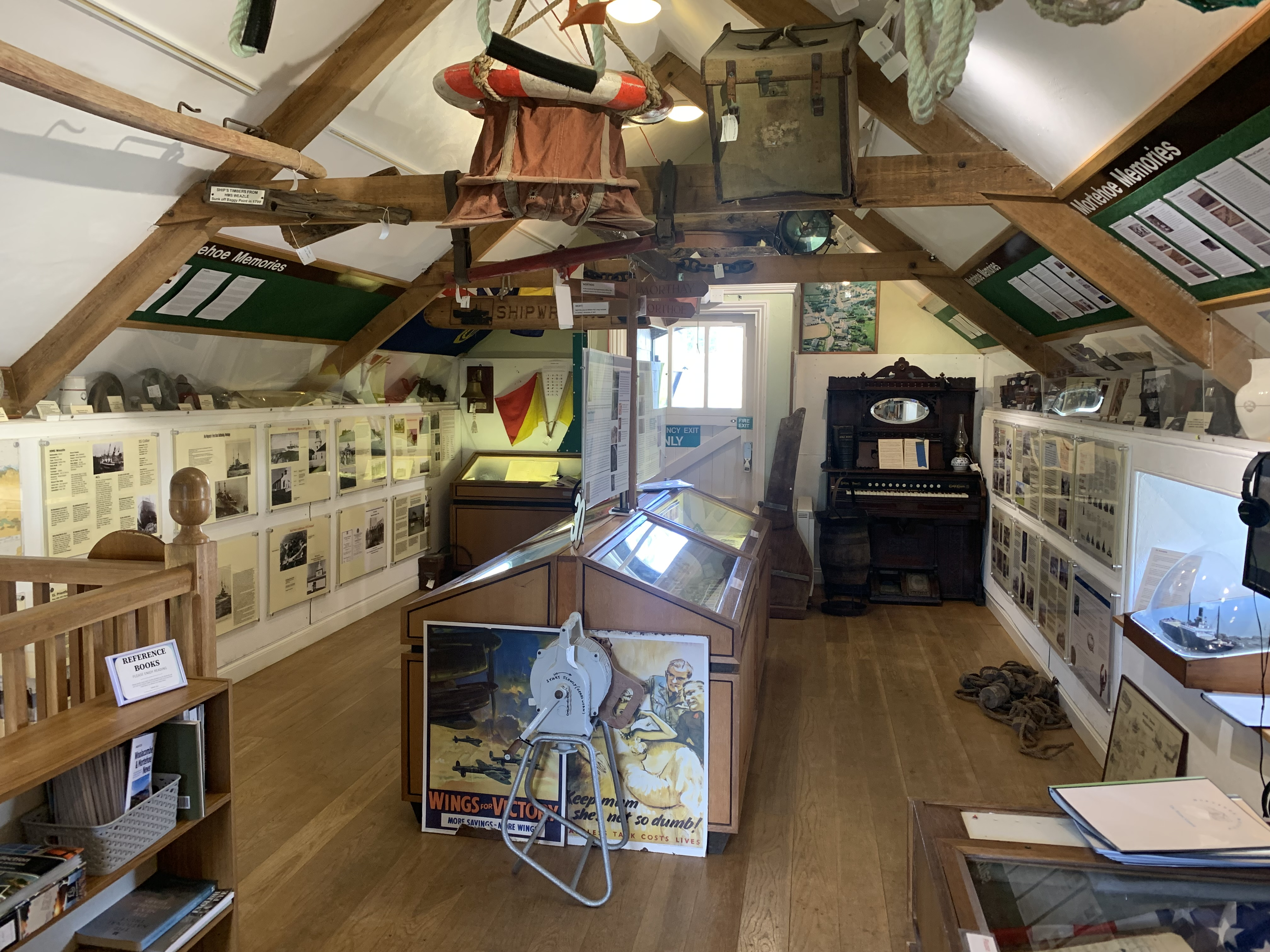
Morthoe Museum Interior

The Mortehoe Museum is a museum located in Mortehoe, Devon, England, 1.5 miles north of Woolacombe. The museum building, originally a barn, is now owned by the National Trust and leased to Mortehoe Heritage Trust, registered charity number 1068961, who run the museum. The museum is located within an Area of Outstanding Natural Beauty. The museum shop sells items such as locally produced arts and crafts, books and maps.

During summer months the museum offers tractor and trailer rides to Bull Point and Morte Point from outside the museum. It also has a children's playground and a picnic area.
