= Lee Bay =

Village in Devon, England

Coordinates: 51.19°N 04.17°W

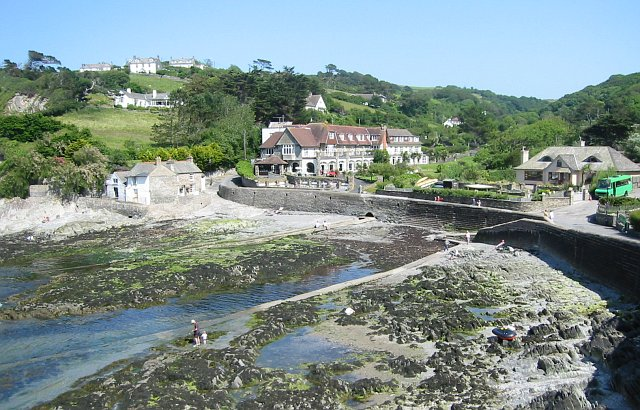

- Location within Devon
- District: North Devon
- Shire county: Devon
- Region: South West
- Country: England
- Sovereign state: United Kingdom
- Post town: ILFRACOMBE
- Postcode district: EX34
- Police: Devon and Cornwall
- Fire: Devon and Somerset
- Ambulance: South Western

Lee Bay or just Lee is a small village on the North Devon coast near Woolacombe. Lee is situated on the rugged and inhospitable stretch of coast between Ilfracombe and Woolacombe, which includes Bull Point (with its lighthouse) and Morte Point, both notorious for shipwrecks in earlier times, and both on the South West Coast Path.

The village of Lee lies at the foot of what is known locally as the Fuchsia Valley, and consists of around 100 properties, mostly old in style. The village centre is about a 350 metres (380 yd) from the sea, and is linked to the area around the bay by a road and level footpath. Lee is served by a combined pub, post office and shop, The Grampus; also by St Matthew's Church and a gift/craft shop operating from the old schoolroom adjoining the church.

Around the bay area was the hotel (visible as the main building in the picture) and some 10 privately owned properties. Up to the late 1980s, several of these were in use as tea rooms, restaurants and gift shops. The hotel has since been demolished in stages with plans to build 17 apartments, four detached homes, a café and public car park.

The beach has a very gentle slope. As the tide goes out an expanse of sand emerges from among the rocks, as does a way through the cliffs westwards round to a large shingle beach called Sandy Cove or Bath Beach. This beach is also accessible from the coastal path via a National Trust-maintained path and staircase down the cliff face.

As the tide recedes further it becomes possible to scramble eastwards from Lee Bay over and round rocks and through pools to reach Broadoar, a mainly sandy beach, although it is possible to become trapped by incoming tides.

The village is covered by both the Ilfracombe and Mortehoe civil parishes.

== See also ==
- Tarka Trail – which follows the line of the South West Coast Path through the village

Lee Bay lies within the North Devon Areas of Outstanding Natural Beauty.

- North Devon Coast Areas of Outstanding Natural Beauty
