= Archibald Keightley Nicholson =

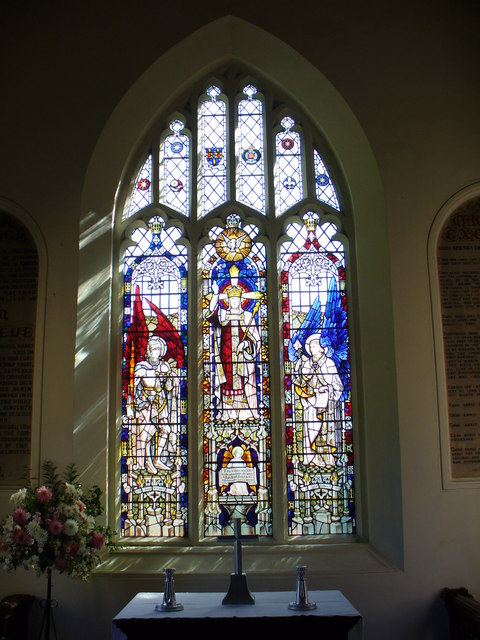
- East Window, St Peter and St Paul, Ewhurst, Surrey
- Born: 28 March 1871; Marylebone, London, England
- Died: 25 February 1937 (aged 65); London, England
- Occupation: stained glass artist
- Known for: ecclesiastical stained-glass
- Father: Charles Nicholson

Archibald Keightley Nicholson (28 March 1871 – 25 February 1937) was an English ecclesiastical stained-glass maker.

Nicholson was born at 26 Devonshire Place, Marylebone, London, the son of Charles Nicholson, 1st Baronet and Sarah Elizabeth Keightley. His two brothers, Charles and Sydney, were a church architect and church musician, respectively.

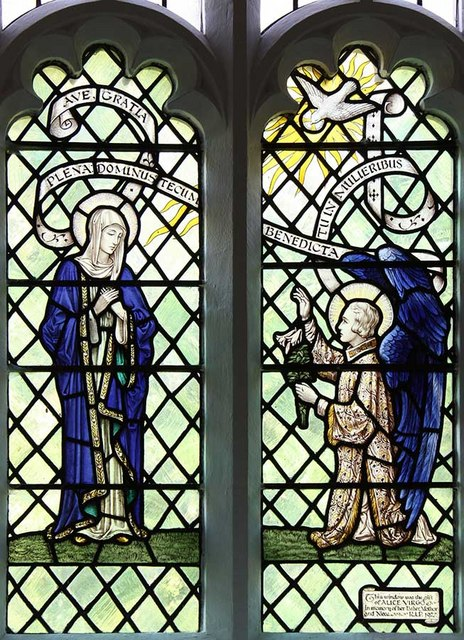
The Annunciation window at St John the Baptist, Wonersh, Surrey

During his lifetime, Nicholson designed and executed over 700 window designs, including work in the cathedrals of Newcastle, Chester, Lincoln, Norwich, Southwell, Bradford, Worcester (the Edward Elgar memorial window) and Wells.

Nicholson designed the rose window of the south transept at the Church of Christ the King, Bloomsbury, along with a 1932 window dedicated to St Stephen Harding in the Musicians' Chapel at St Sepulchre-without-Newgate, both in London. The latter church also contains a memorial window to him, by Gerald E. R. Smith, with the following inscription:

"To the glory of God. In memory of Archibald Keightley Nicholson, Master Glass Painter, who worshipped at this church. This window is designed and carried out by the craftsmen of his studios as a thank offering for his life and friendship. 1871 - 1937."

The east window of 1902 at St John the Baptist, Wonersh, Surrey, is Nicholson's earliest commissioned work. It was installed in memory of two soldiers, and depicts Christ with St George and St Alban, both military saints. Nicholson also produced two smaller windows in the north wall depicting the Madonna & Child and the Annunciation.

In St Wilfrid's Church, Mobberley is Nicholson's window to the memory of George Mallory the mountaineer, who died on Mount Everest in 1924.

The Lady Chapel of Waltham Abbey Church contains three windows by Nicholson. They depict the Annunciation, the Nativity and the Presentation of Christ in the Temple. Work on a fourth window depicting the Epiphany was interrupted by the Second World War and never resumed.

The East window behind the altar in the church of St Peter and St Paul's in Ewhurst, Surrey was commissioned as a memorial window for the 24-year-old Captain William Ralph Frecheville, executed after his capture on 9 January 1920 in Rostov-on-Don, Russia, whilst serving as part of the Allied intervention in the Russian Civil War.

Several windows by Nicholson may also be seen in St Gabriel's church, Brynmill, Swansea. The largest of these is the great east window above the high altar which was dedicated in 1925. The principal figures are the archangels Gabriel and Michael, flanked by figures representing the Te Deum and with the Doctors of the Church in the lower panels. The style would appear to be a little dated, but the Vicar at the time was obviously delighted: "a triumph of the artist's skill", he wrote, "the beauty of the design, the richness and blending of the colours, the majesty of the figures, the expressions of the faces make it the grand and inspired conception of one who is at the same time a great artist and a devout Catholic". There are smaller windows on the south side of the sanctuary also of 1925-26 showing Saint Helen and Saint Catherine of Alexandria but in a more contemporary style. The windows in the Lady Chapel over the altar and on the south wall are by Nicholson and date from 1925–26. They depict themes related to the life of Our Lady.

One of Nicholson's later commissions is the Nutman Window at the Church of St Sabinus at Woolacombe and which is dedicated to William John Nutman who received the Albert Medal First Class from Queen Victoria in 1896. The window was given in Nutman's memory by his daughters in 1936.

== List of works ==
England

- Chester Cathedral, Chester, Cheshire
- St Wilfrid's Church, Mobberley, Cheshire (Memorial window to George Mallory)
- Church of St Sabinus, Woolacombe, Devon (Memorial to William J. Nutman)
- Church of St Lawrence and the Holy Cross, Waltham Abbey, Essex
- Church of Christ the King, Bloomsbury, Greater London
- St Sepulchre-without-Newgate, City of London, Greater London (Saint Stephen Harding)
- Lincoln Cathedral, Lincoln, Lincolnshire
- St Andrew's Church, Framingham Pigot, Norfolk
- Norwich Cathedral, Norwich, Norfolk
- Southwell Minster, Southwell, Nottinghamshire
- Wells Cathedral, Wells, Somerset
- Church of St Peter and St Paul, Ewhurst, Surrey (Memorial window to Cpt. Ralph Frecheville)
- Church of St John the Baptist, Wonersh, Surrey (Saint George and Saint Alban)
- Newcastle Cathedral, Newcastle upon Tyne, Tyne and Wear
- Worcester Cathedral, Worcester, Worcestershire (Memorial window to Edward Elgar)
- Bradford Cathedral, Bradford, West Yorkshire
- St Michaels and All Angels Church, Chalton, Hampshire
- Crowland Abbey, Crowland, Lincs
- St Mary's Church, Ickworth, Suffolk

Wales

- St Gabriel's Church, Brynmill, West Glamorgan (Gabriel and Michael)
