= Sabinus =

Sabinus may refer to:

== Ancient Romans ==
- Sabinus (Ovid) (died AD 14 or 15), Roman poet, known friend of Ovid
- Appius Claudius Sabinus Regillensis, founder of the Claudian family
- Masurius Sabinus, Roman jurist who lived during the reign of Tiberius (Tiberius reigned 14-37 AD)
- Titus Flavius Sabinus (disambiguation), several people
- Quintus Titurius Sabinus (died 54 BC), legate under Julius Caesar
- Gaius Poppaeus Sabinus, consul in AD 9
- Julius Sabinus, Romanised Gaul who rebelled against Rome, living around AD 69
- Gaius Valarius Sabinus, Roman finance minister around AD 271
- Sabinus of Heraclea, 4th-century historian

== Saints ==
- Sabinus of Canosa (461–566), bishop of Canosa in Italy
- Sabinus of Hermopolis, 3rd century Christian martyr in Egypt
- Sabinus of Piacenza (333–420), bishop of Piacenza in Italy
- Sabinus of Spoleto (died 304), Roman martyr

== Other uses ==
- Angelus Sabinus (15th century), Italian Renaissance poet and classical philologist
- Georg Sabinus (1508–1560), first rector of University of Königsberg
- Sabinus (opera), a 1773 opera by Gossec

== See also ==
- Sabines, a tribe in Latium predating the Roman Republic
