= Creation Fest =

Creation Fest is a free Christian music festival, which takes place on the first weekend of August in the Royal Cornwall Showground, Cornwall, England. Prior to 2009 it was held in neighbouring Devon.

== History ==
The California-based Calvary Chapel established a church 'plant' (a new congregation) in Woolacombe, North Devon, in 2000. The following year the church members were given a vision to put on a Christian music festival, and Creation Fest was born.

The first festival was in the summer of 2002 as a one-day event and has grown as an event to a three-day festival. The festival was originally based in Woolacombe, and ministered to the people of North Devon as well as people from all over the world. The organisers want to see local churches getting involved as much as possible and for the event to be a blessing and a reaping ground for those churches. They also want to partner with churches nationally and internationally to fulfil the Great Commission.

The festival was held in Woolacombe until 2008. The 2009 festival was held at the Royal Cornwall Showground in Wadebridge (the field used for the festival in Woolacombe became unavailable).

== Aims ==
Creation Fest exists with the aim to promote Christianity through contemporary Christian music. They also desire to see Christians established in the basics of Christianity, the authority of the scripture proclaimed and Churches brought together in unity.
