= Sabinus of Canosa =

Bishop of Canosa

Saint Sabinus of Canosa
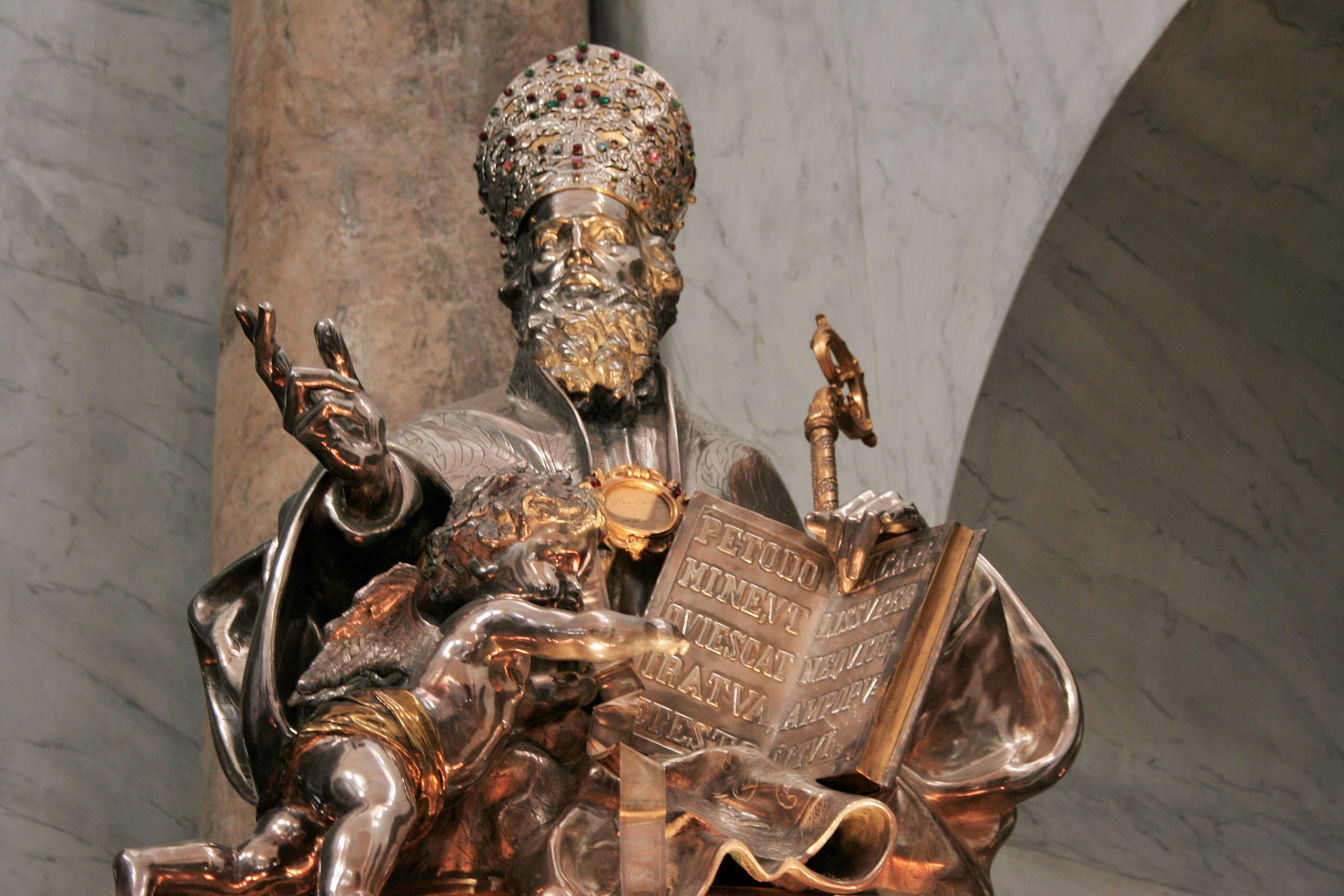

Priest, Bishop
- Born: 461; Canosa di puglia, Apulia, Italy
- Died: 566; Canosa di Puglia, Apulia, Italy
- Venerated in: Roman Catholic Church
- Major shrine: Cattedrale di Canosa, Italy
- Feast: February_9
- Patronage: Canosa, Atripalda

for other people called Sabinus, see Sabinus (disambiguation)

Saint Sabinus of Canosa (Italian: San Sabino) (461 – 9 February 566), venerated as a saint in the Roman Catholic church, was bishop of Canosa di Puglia from 514.

== Life ==
He was sent twice as a papal envoy to Constantinople, in 525, by Pope John I and in 536 to accompany Pope Agapitus I, who lost his life on the journey, to defend the true faith against the Monophysite heresy. He attended the Council of Constantinople (536).

In 531, in the papacy of Pope Boniface II, he took part in the Synod of Rome. He was a builder of churches and other religious buildings, according to the Benedictine discipline of Ora et labora ("Work and pray").

He died after 52 years as bishop, on 9 February 566.

== Cult ==
Sabinus was a friend of Saint Benedict, whom he visited at Montecassino and to whom, as recorded by Gregory the Great, he once expressed his preoccupations on the incursions of the Ostrogoth King Totila into the Italian peninsula. According to the hagiographic legend, he succeeded in saving Canosa di Puglia from the threat of the latter. There is a story that in 548 Totila wanted to test the prophetic gifts of Sabinus, who was by then old and blind. The king, pretending to be a servant, offered him a goblet of wine, but Sabinus was not deceived and thanked him by name, which impressed Totila so much that he renounced his pillaging.

Another legend of Sabinus relates that a jealous archdeacon tried to poison him. Sabinus drank the poison but did not die; but the archdeacon did. For this reason he appeared in the liturgy as a protector against poisons.

His relics were translated to the present Canosa Cathedral on 1 August in an unknown year of the 8th century by bishop Pietro. After the destruction of the town by the Saracens, the relics were rescued from the ruins by Saint Angelarius in 844 and taken to Bari Cathedral.

Saint Sabinus is venerated in Canosa and Bari, in both of which places the cathedrals are dedicated to him, in Torremaggiore and Furci.

The only church in the United Kingdom dedicated to him is the Church of St Sabinus in Woolacombe in Devon.

=== Feast days ===
- Canosa di Puglia, 9 February: death of Saint Sabinus
- Torremaggiore, the first Saturday, Sunday, Monday and Tuesday in June: Festa Patronale
- Canosa di Puglia, 31 July to 2 August: Festa Patronale
