= Church of St Sabinus, Woolacombe =

Church in Devon, England

Coordinates: 51.17276°N 4.20233°W

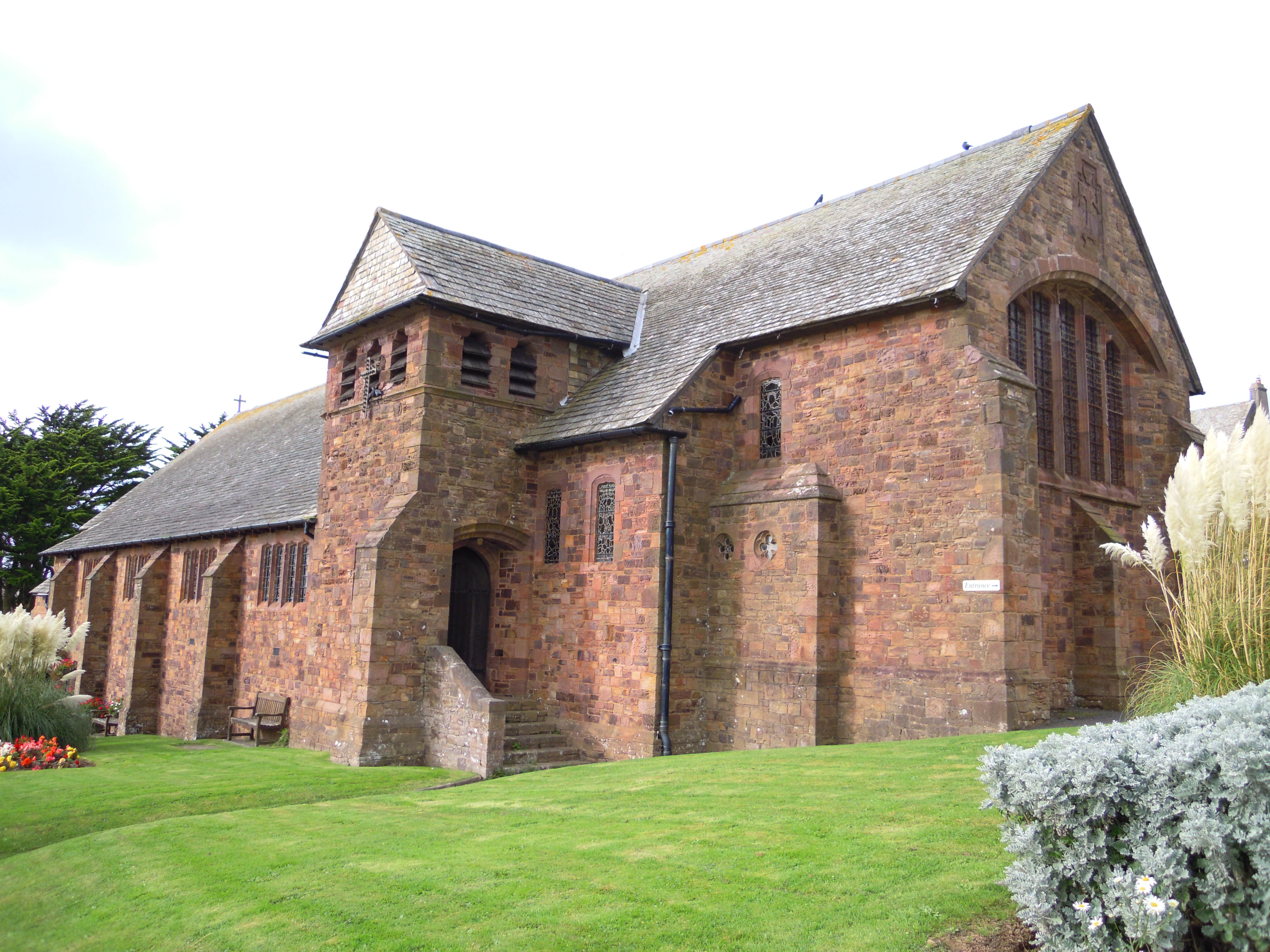
The Church of St Sabinus was designed by W. D. Caröe and was consecrated in 1912

The Church of St Sabinus is the Church of England parish church for in Woolacombe, Devon. It is the only church in the United Kingdom that is dedicated to St Sabinus of Canosa and has been a Grade II* listed building since 1985. The church comes under the Diocese of Exeter.

== Dedication ==
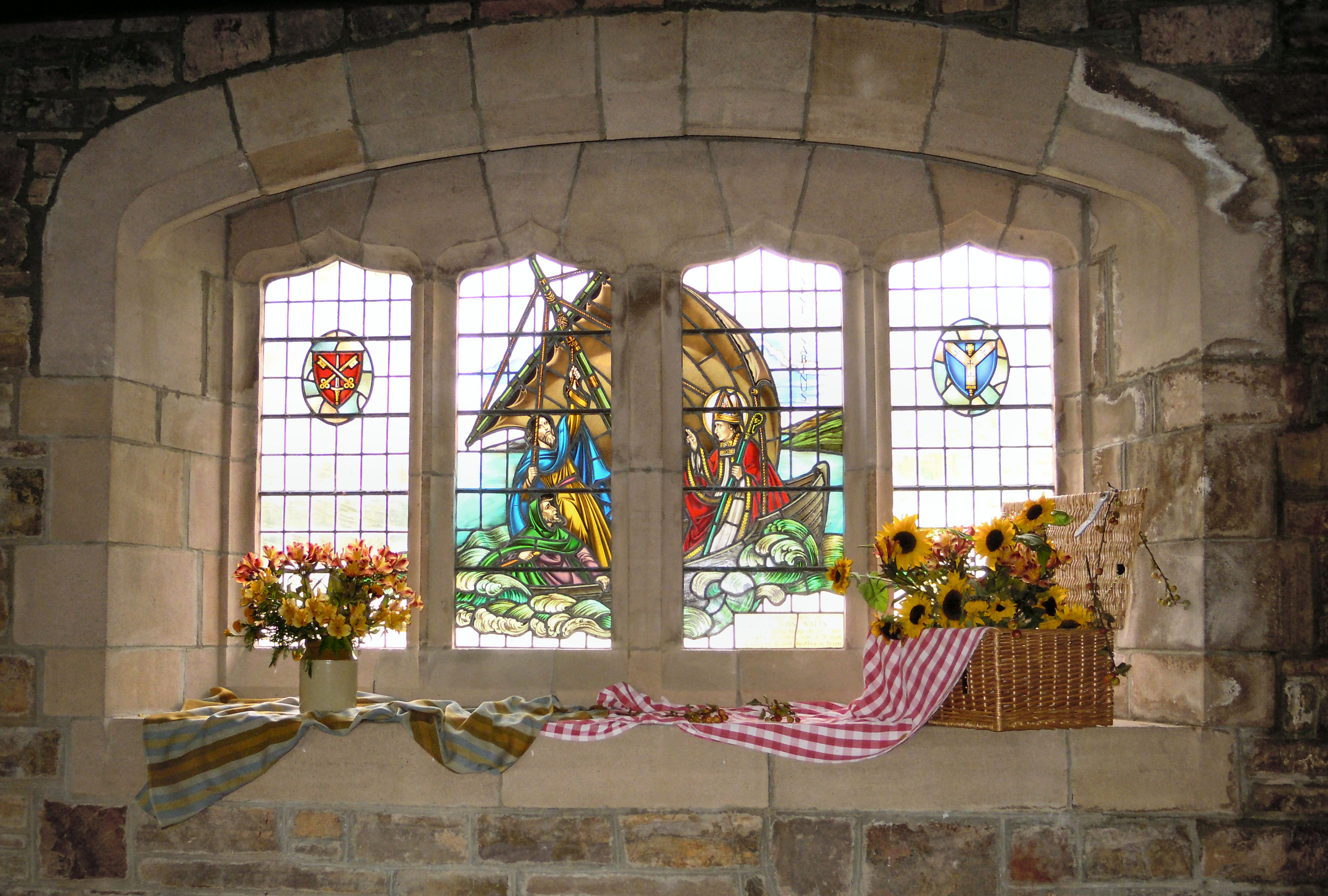
Window depicting the legend of St Sabinus

It is not known why the church is dedicated to St Sabinus; in the 13th-century there was a chapel in nearby Barnstaple dedicated to him but this no longer exists. There is a popular local legend that the church is actually dedicated to a Celtic saint of the same name from Ireland who was shipwrecked on Woolacombe Sands, but there is no historical evidence to support that claim.

Lady Rosalie Chichester of the local land-owning Chichester Family is believed to have been involved in the choice of a name and is known to have travelled extensively in Italy where she may have heard of St Sabinus; she may also have been aware of the Barnstaple connection.

== History ==
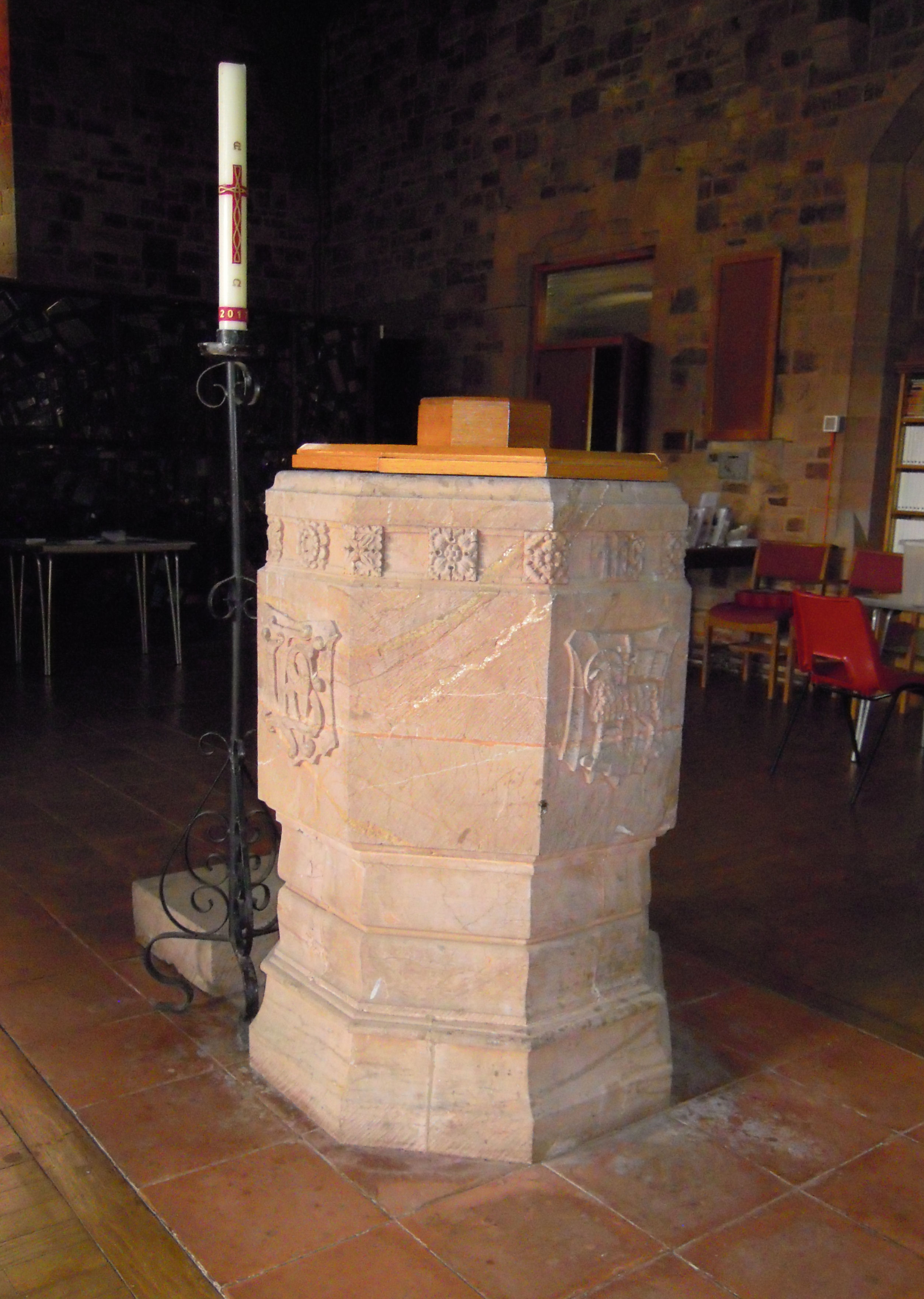
The baptismal font dates to 1916

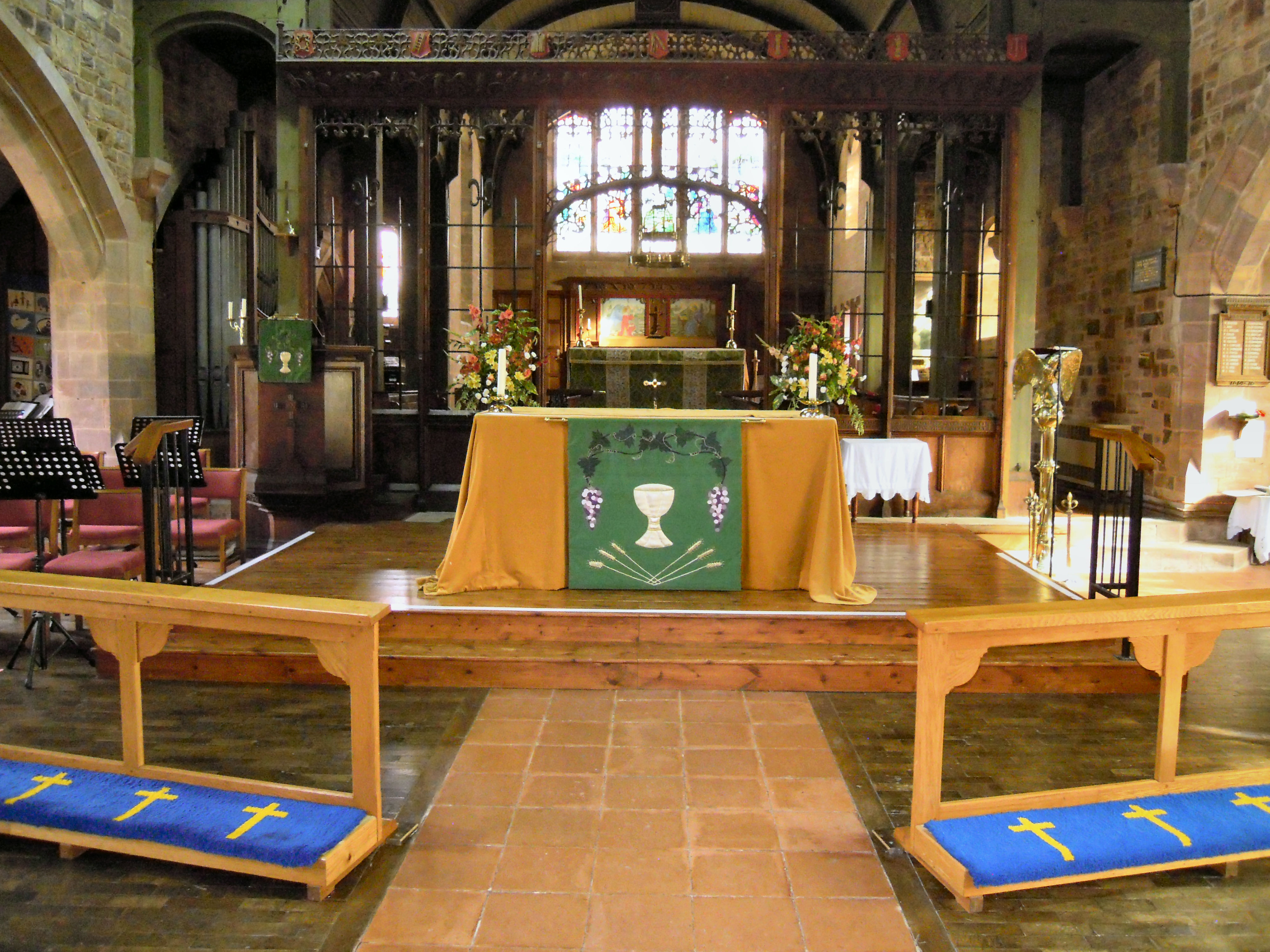
View down the nave towards the chancel

The original St Sabinus' Church was a small building known as the "Iron Church" erected about 200 yards up the hill out of Woolacombe. This catered for the increasing numbers of Victorian tourists who were regular visitors to the village and was extended in 1895 to include a chancel. This church was funded by the Chichester Family whose country seat was at Arlington Court 15 miles away. An appeal was launched to raise funds for a permanent church for the town. The Chichester Family donated the land, £200 and the necessary stone towards the building of the churchouse. The new church was designed by the architect W. D. Caröe and built between 1909 and 1912 and consecrated in 1912; it is sited on the main road into the village centre and is designed to resist winter storms from the Atlantic Ocean.

The church became part of the Ilfracombe Team Ministry in 1977. The Electoral Roll is about 65 and the average attendance each Sunday is 60.

== Design ==
The church is built of squared red sandstone rubble with stone dressings. It features Delabole slate roofs with gable ends. The nave and chancel have narrow aisles which are flat-roofed to the north. The asymmetrical placed transeptal tower stump is covered with a saddleback roof. The north aisle was completed in 1965 due to a lack of funds previously. The aisles have low three-light windows. The chancel is slightly narrower than the nave and has three-bay arcades and a waggon roof with carved corbel bosses at the east end. There is an elaborate wooden chancel screen with grille; the octagonal baptismal font with fleuron decoration dates to 1916. The pulpit is slightly earlier, dating to 1914. The sedilia has quatrefoil windows to the chancel of two seats and the piscina to left has a scalloped base.

Among the stained glass windows are those by the studio of Charles Eamer Kempe and Archibald Keightley Nicholson which variously depict the legend of St Sabinus being shipwrecked at Woolacombe Sands and which was installed in 1969 in memory of Royal Marine commando Ernest John "Jack" Watts (1925–1946); the window dedicated to the Colville Family was installed in 1969; the War Memorial Window installed in 1919 and produced by the Kempe studio; the Nutman Window is the work of Archibald Nicholson and is dedicated to William John Nutman, captain of the SS Aidar, who received the Albert Medal, first class from Queen Victoria for his great gallantry in saving the life of an injured crewman during a storm in the Mediterranean Sea on the night of 19 January 1896.

== Gallery ==
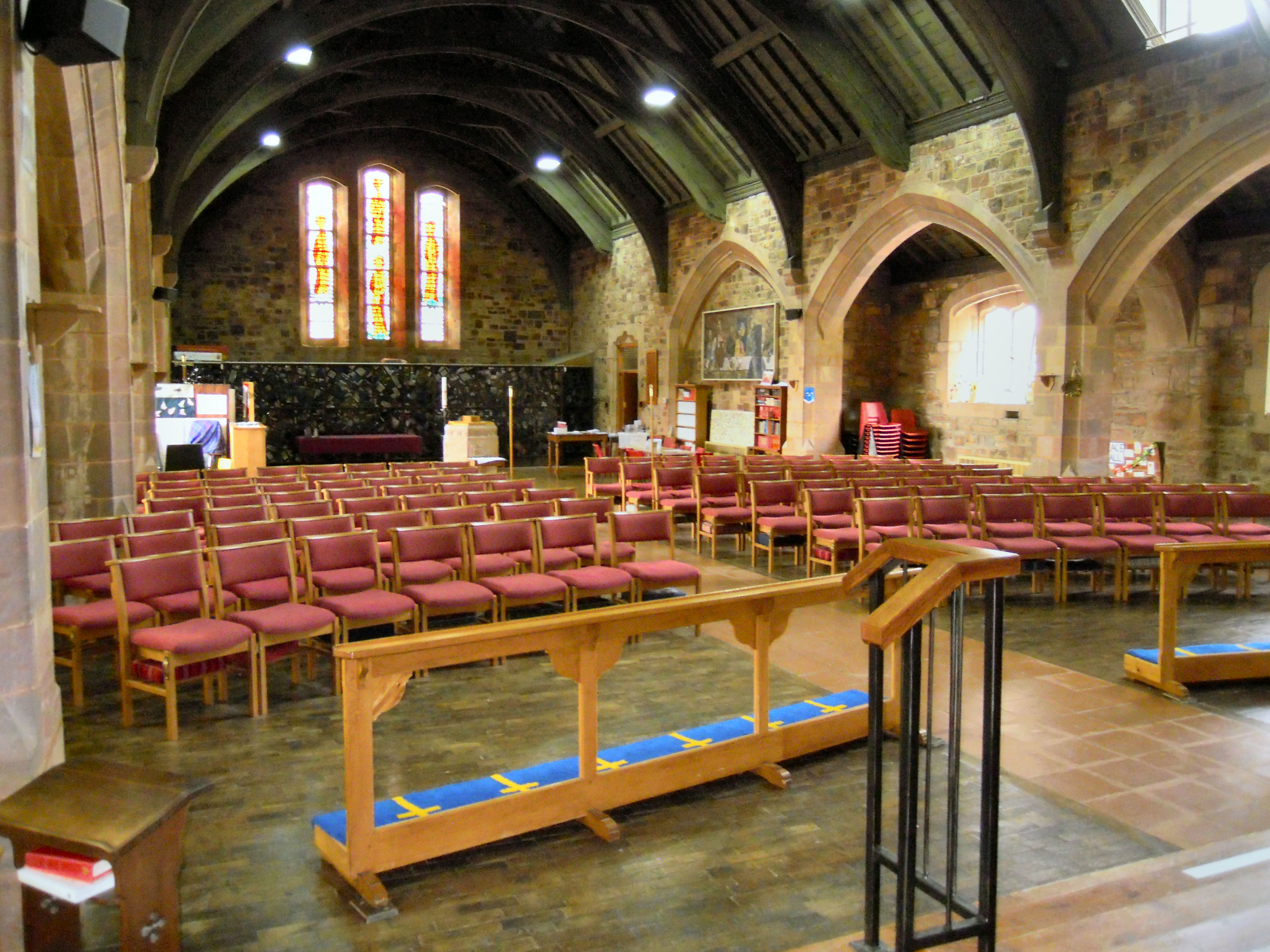
View down the nave

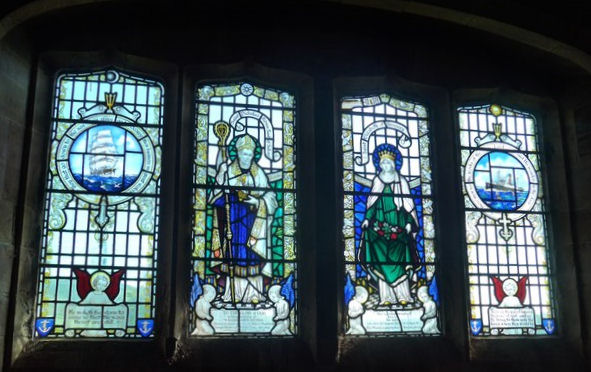
Window dedicated to Captain William John Nutman, AM

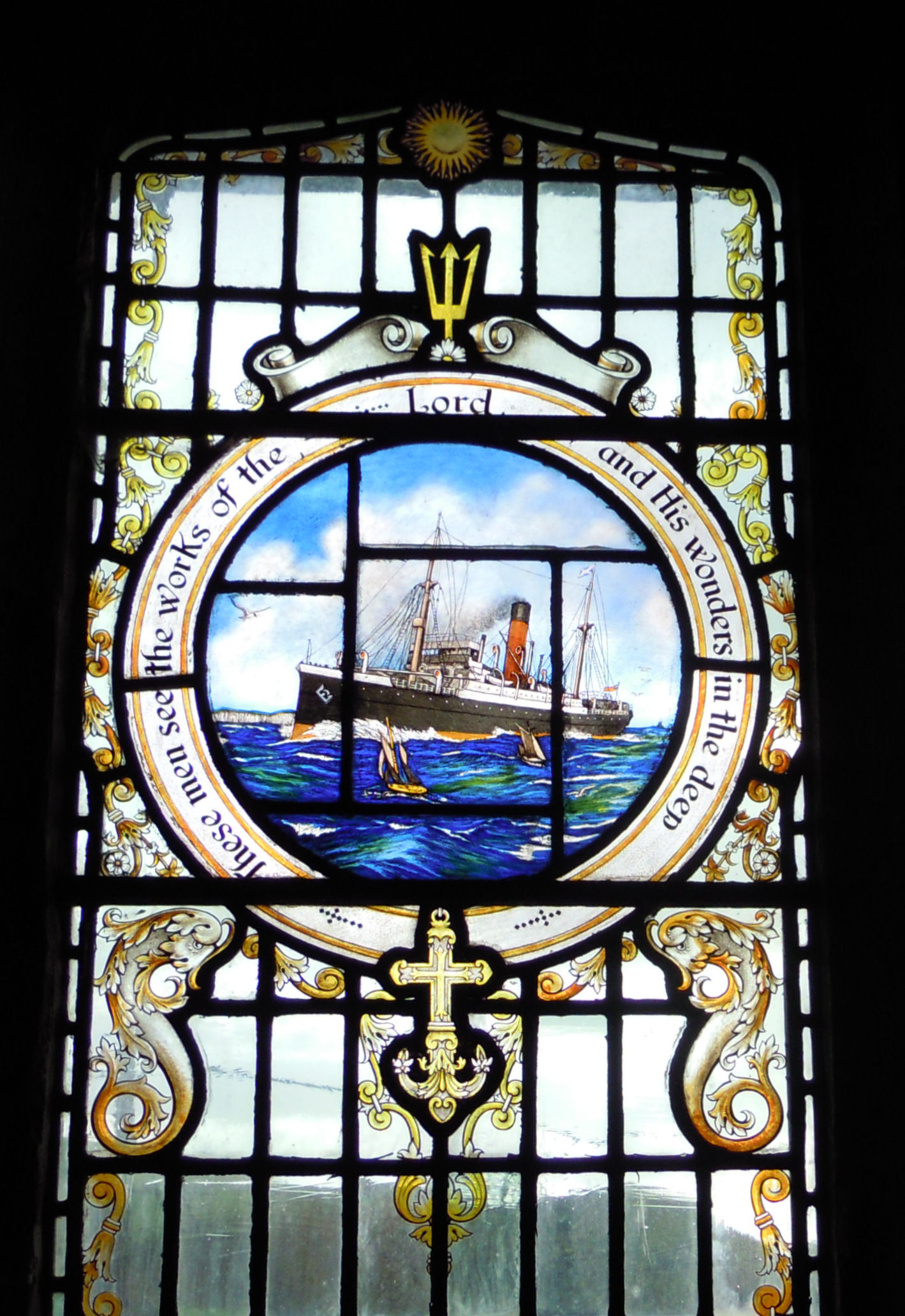
Detail of the Nutman Window showing SS Aidar

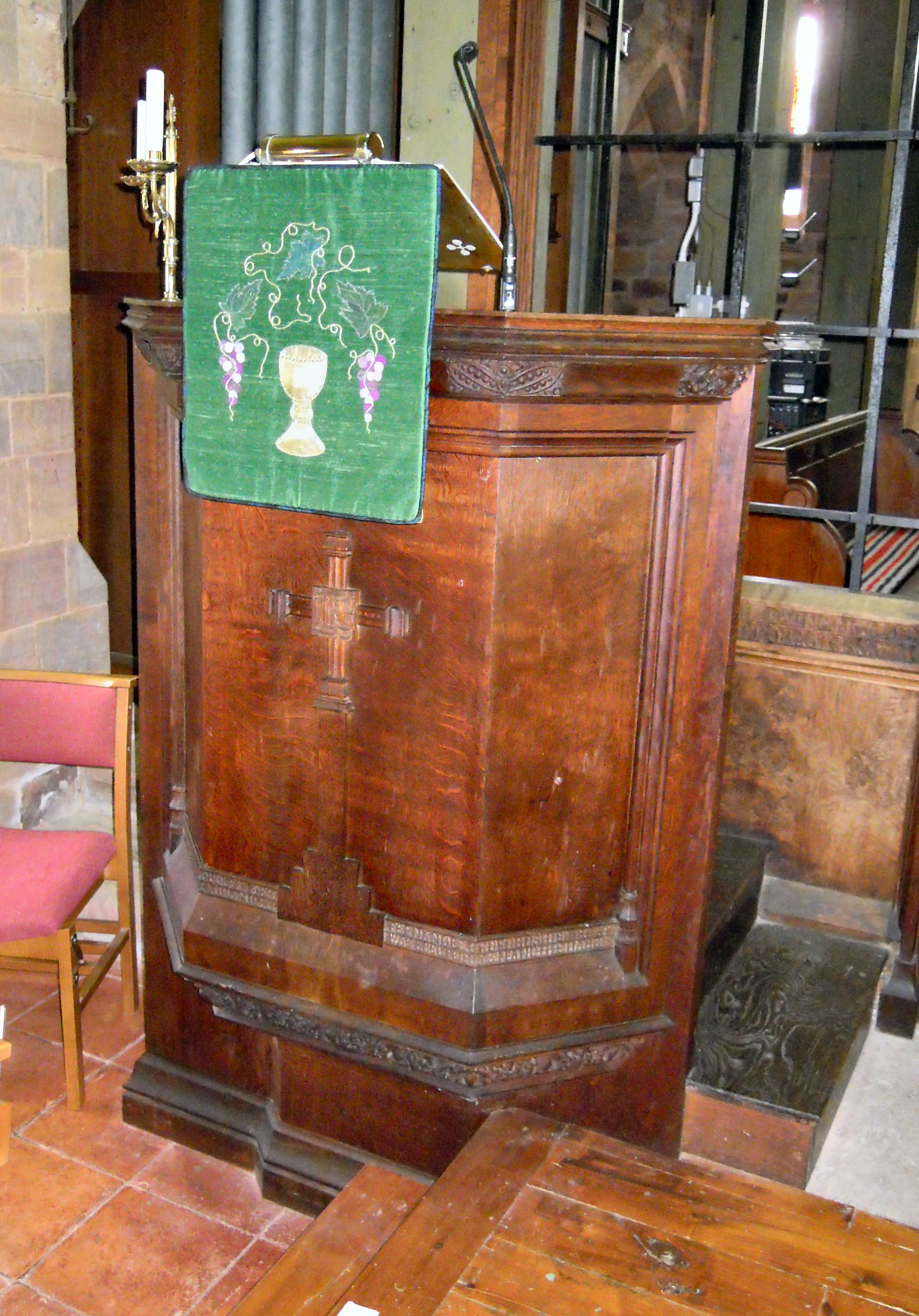
The pulpit dates to 1914

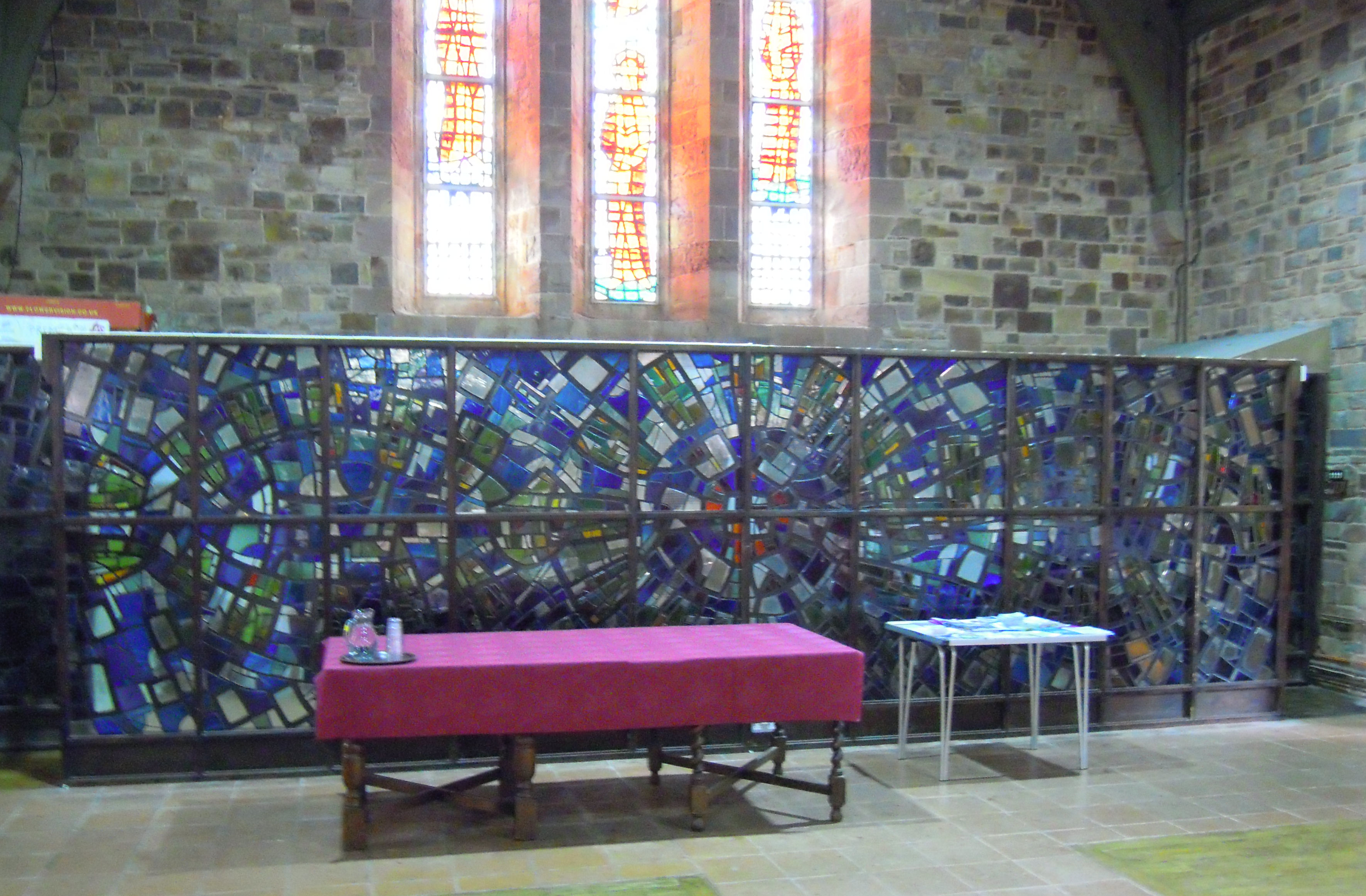
The distinctive glass screen at the rear of the church
