= St Mary's Church, Mortehoe =

Medieval church

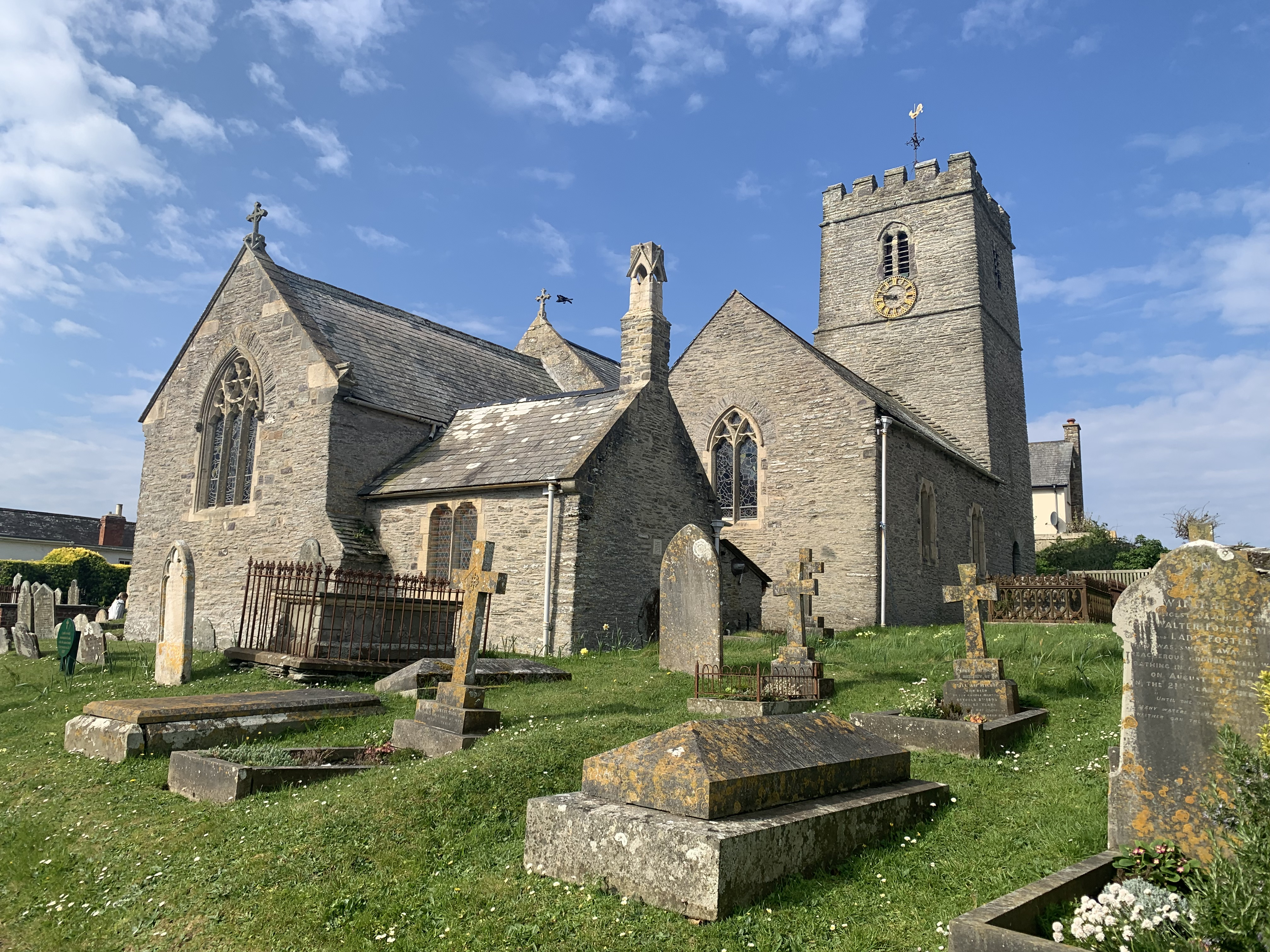
- St Mary's Church, Mortehoe
- St Mary's Church, Mortehoe
- 51°11′06″N 4°12′33″W
- OS grid reference: SS 45694 45190
- Location: Morthoe
- Country: England
- Denomination: Church of England

Architecture
- Style: Norman, Early English
- Years built: Eleventh Century

St Mary's Church, Mortehoe, is a Grade I listed Church of England church in Mortehoe, Devon, England, whose origins date back to the Norman Conquest. It retains many original medieval features, including a notable tomb containing the remains of Sir William de Tracy.

== History ==
The oldest parts of the Anglican church of St Mary date back to Norman times, but it has been added to in subsequent years. The bell tower, carved pews and the de Tracy tomb (see below) are medieval. The chancel-arch mosaic and the 'archangel' window were designed by Selwyn Image. The later parts of the building are of the 14th and 16th centuries. The carved bench-ends are 13th century, the wagon roof of the nave 15th century and the chest tomb of William de Tracey, Rector of Mortehoe has been dated to 1322.

=== Tomb of Sir William de Tracy ===
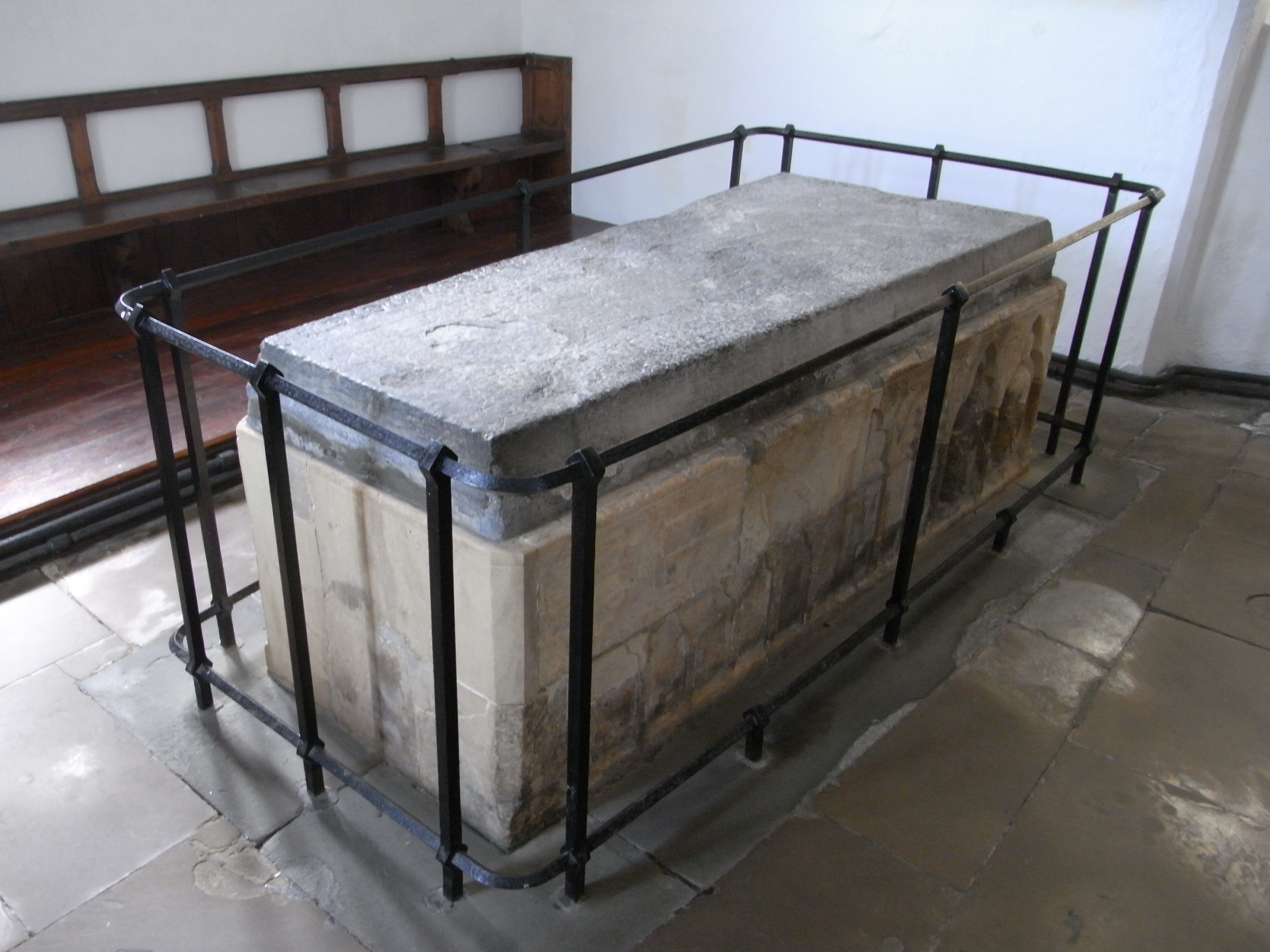
Chest tomb of Sir William de Tracy (d.1322), cleric, incumbent of Mortehoe. South transept, St Mary's Parish Church, Mortehoe

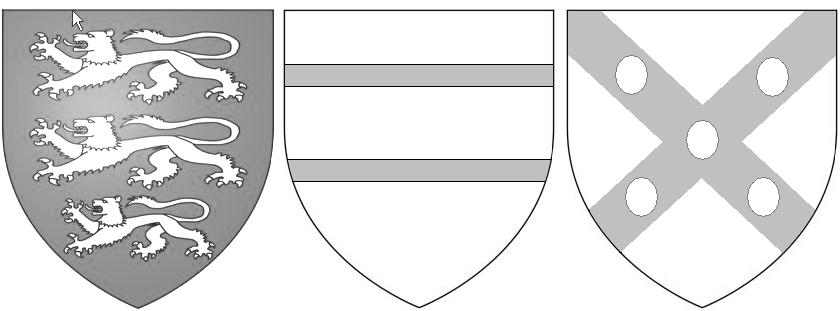
Group of heraldic shields sculpted in low relief on north side of base of chest tomb of Sir William de Tracy (d.1322), Mortehoe Church

The tomb in the south transept has a ledger-line inscription to a certain "Sir William de Tracy". The upper slab of black or dark grey granite or marble is incised with the life-size figure of a priest in full vestments, holding a chalice to his breast. The inscription is much defaced, but was recorded by Tristram Risdon (d.1630):

"On whose mangled monument I found this fragment of a French inscription, in this ancient character: 'Syree Williame de Trace...Il enat eeys-Meercy'".

Possibly a variant of such phrase as que Dieu ait mercy de son âme ("may God have mercy on his soul"). On the north side of the base of the tomb are sculpted in relief three escutcheons, now devoid of any colourings, listed from east to west :

- The first, showing three lions passant in pale, is possibly for Camville. Geoffrey de Camville (d.1308) was the second husband of Maud de Tracy (d.pre-1279), granddaughter and sole heiress of Henry de Tracy (d.1274), feudal baron of Barnstaple.
- The second, two bars, possibly for FitzMartin. Maud de Tracy's first husband was Nicholas FitzMartin (d.1260), feudal baron of Blagdon, Somerset. Their son William I FitzMartin (d.1324) inherited Barnstaple. The Victorian stained glass shield in the window of the south transept shows this shield as Azure, two bars argent, whilst the arms generally attributed to the Martin family are Argent, two bars gules
- The third, a saltire, charged with five roundels. The Victorian stained glass shield in the window of the south transept shows this shield as Argent, a saltire gules charged with five bezants A further shield is shown in the Victorian window: Or, two bends gules, in a canton an escallop sable, a representation of the arms of Tracy: "Or, an escallop sable in chief between two bends gules".

On the same north side of the base at the west end, beneath plain canopies, are effigies representing possibly St. Catherine with her wheel, and St. Mary Magdalene, with long flowing hair. The south side of the tomb-base is divided into seven compartments, filled with Early Decorated gothic tracery; the Crucifixion forms the subject of the relief sculpture at the west end of the tomb-base, showing Christ on the cross with two standing figures either side.

Lord Sudeley insists this is the tomb of William de Tracy who is known to have been the incumbent of this church, endowed a chantry at Mortehoe in 1307/8, and died in 1322. The priest is described as 'Sir' because this was an oft-used prefix for priests in medieval times.

== Gallery ==
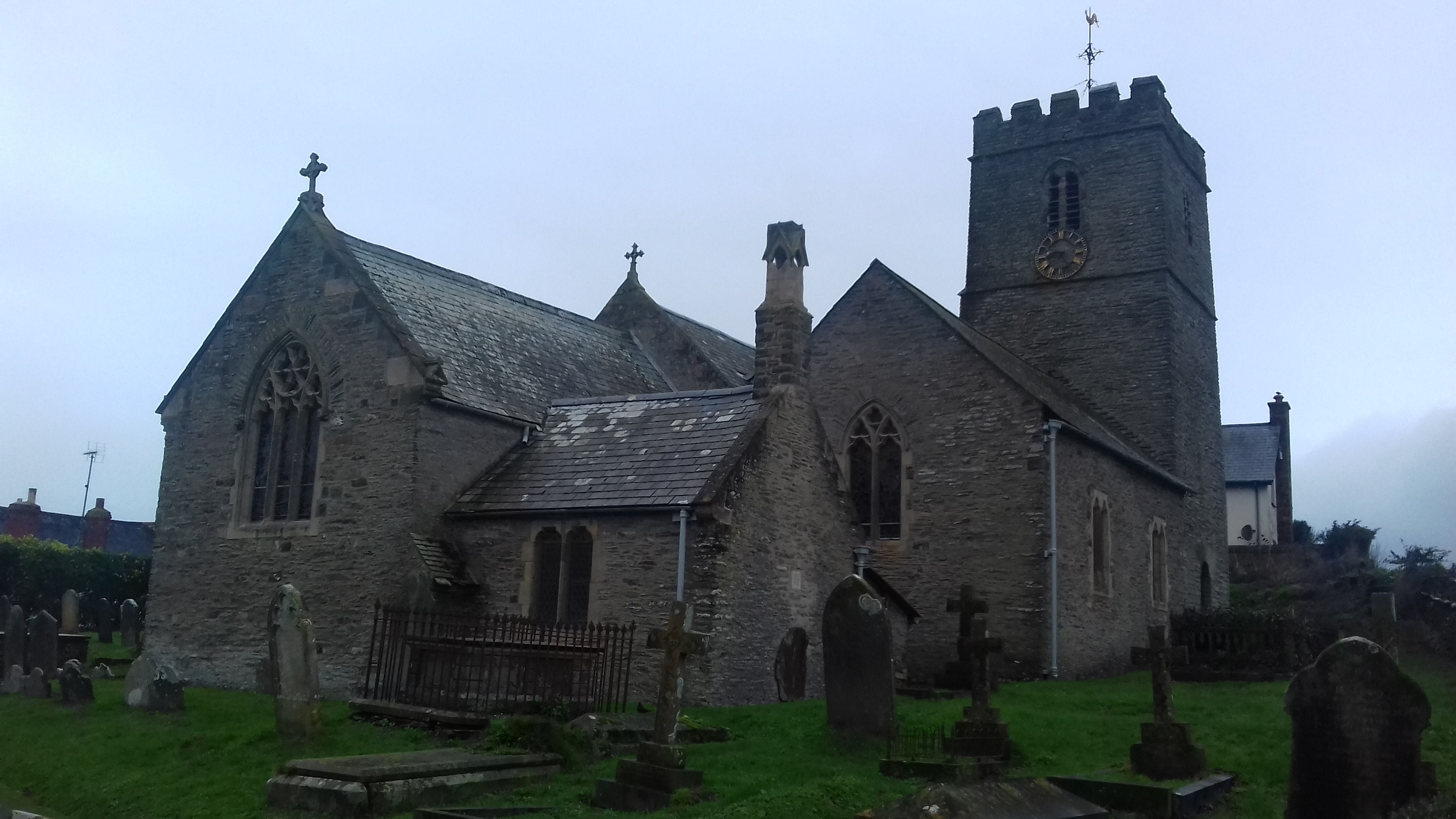
St Mary's Church Morthoe, Exterior view

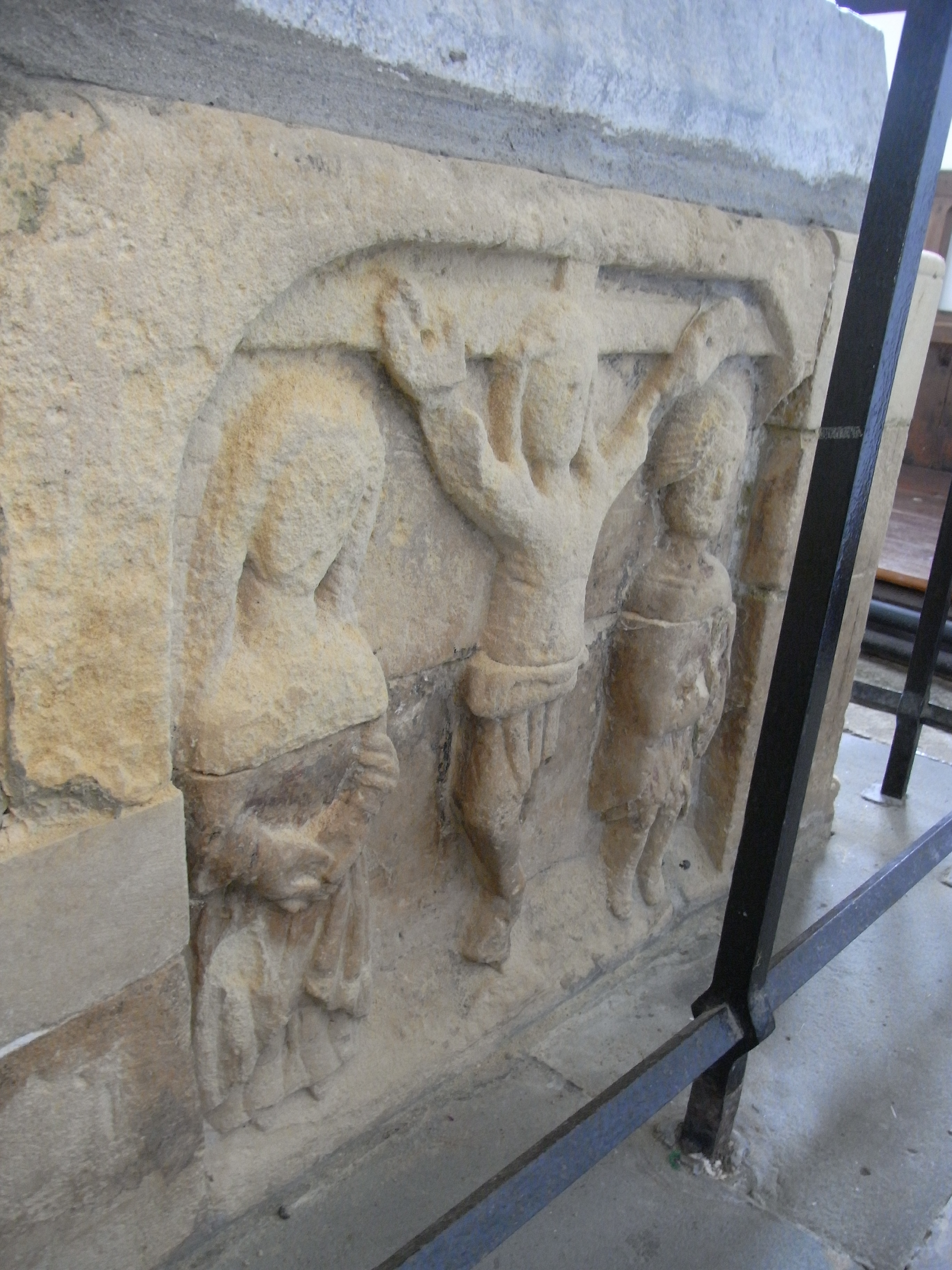
Crucifixion scene, sculpted in low relief on west end of base of chest tomb of Sir William de Tracy (d.1322), cleric, incumbent of Mortehoe; South transept.

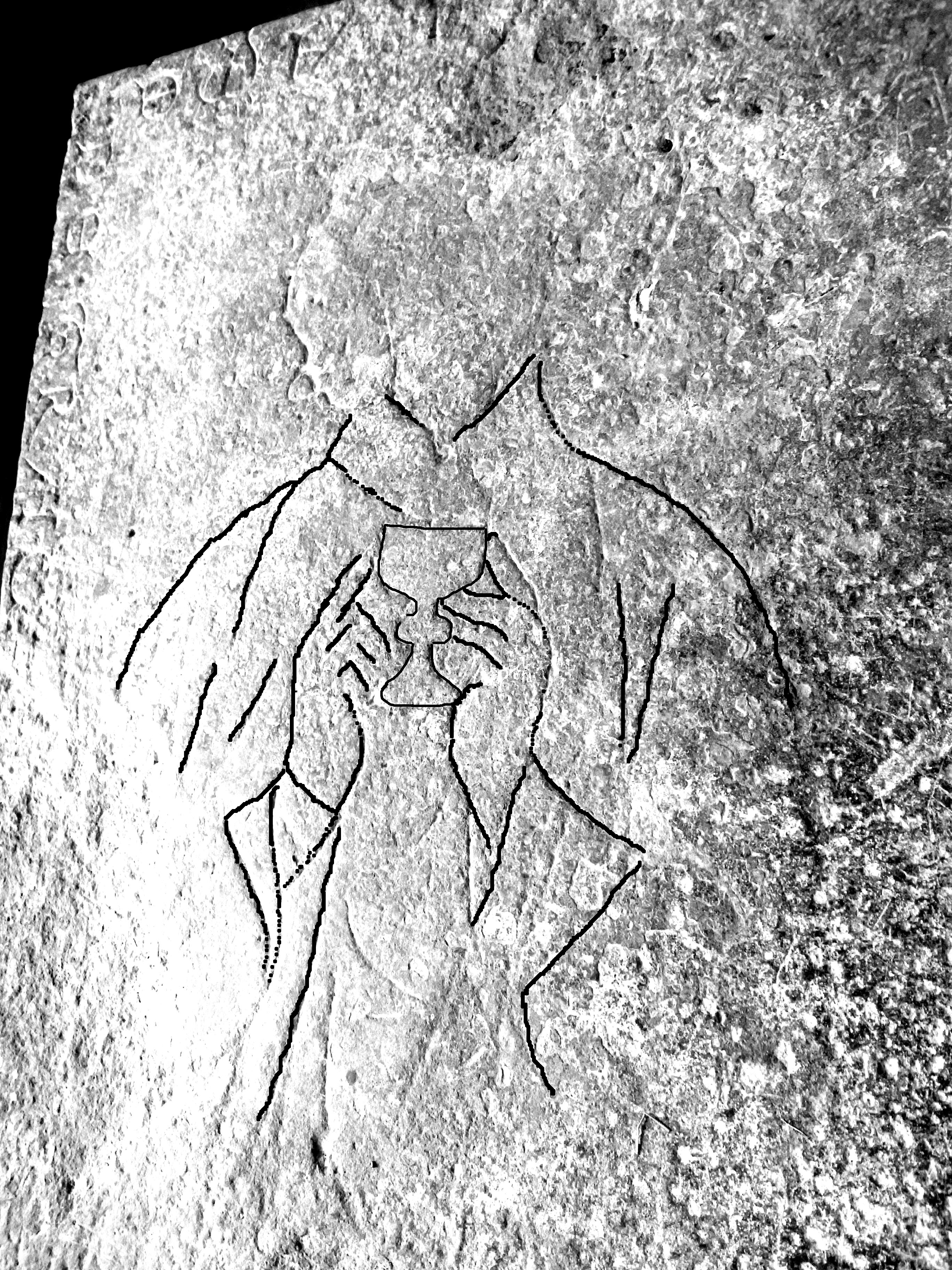
Enhanced outline of figure incised on slab, showing chalice held to the chest and clerical vestments.
