= Bull Point Lighthouse =

Lighthouse on the coast of Devon, England

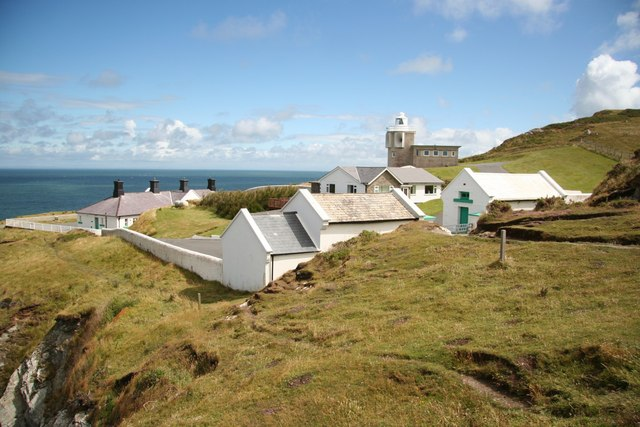
- Bull Point Lighthouse
- Location: Mortehoe; Devon; England
- Coordinates: 51°11′56.8″N 4°12′04.4″W

Tower
- Constructed: 1879 (first); 1972 (second)
- Construction: brick tower (current) metal skeletal tower (second)
- Automated: 1975
- Height: 11 m (36 ft)
- Shape: cylindrical tower with balcony and lantern attached to 1-storey keeper's house
- Markings: unpainted tower, white lantern
- Operator: Rural Retreats

Light
- First lit: 1974 (current)
- Focal height: 54 m (177 ft)
- Lens: small 6 panel 3rd order catadioptric optic
- Intensity: 89,900 candela
- Range: 18 nmi (33 km)
- Characteristic: Fl (3) W 10s.

Bull Point Lighthouse is a lighthouse on Bull Point, about one mile (1.6 km) north of the village of Mortehoe, on the northern coast of Devon, England. The lighthouse provides a visual aid to the villages of Mortehoe, Woolacombe and Ilfracombe, and warns of the inhospitable and rocky coast that lines the area.

== The old lighthouse ==
The original lighthouse was constructed in 1879 after a group of local "clergy, ship-owners, merchants and landowners" appealed to Trinity House for one. It was built on Bull Point, though the Maritime Corporations of the Bristol Channel seaboard had lobbied strongly for it to be placed offshore on the Morte Stone (a local hazard to shipping).

Bull Point Lighthouse was a two-storey round tower, 30 ft (9.1 m) high and 13 ft (4.0 m) wide, built of local stone and Blue Lias lime, and faced with Portland cement; it was topped by a large cylindrical lantern to give a total height of 55 feet (17 m). Inside, the light-source (a Douglass six-wick oil-powered lamp) was set within a revolving first-order optic, manufactured (along with the lantern) by Chance Brothers of Smethwick. The optic, consisting of three asymmetric lens panels backed by a dioptric mirror, was an early example of the application of group-flashing lens technology (introduced by Dr John Hopkinson of Chance Brothers in 1874). Rotated by a weight-driven clockwork, it displayed three white flashes every half minute at an elevation of 154 ft (47 m) above mean high water springs. A fixed red sector light was also displayed, from a window in the tower, to mark the Morte Stone; this used light diverted by lenses from the landward side of the main light source.

A fog siren was also provided, powered by two 12 h.p. caloric engines (provided by Brown & co. of New York); it gave three blasts every two minutes. The fog signal equipment was housed in a separate engine room, built (together with a coke store and a small workshop) on the seaward side of the tower; it sounded through a single vertical horn, which was designed to rotate so that it could be angled to face into the wind when in use. On the landward side of the tower, a set of dwellings was constructed 'for two married keepers and one married assistant'. The dwellings, tower and engine room were linked by passageways; they were set, along with gardens and outbuildings, in a 12,000 sq ft compound.

In 1919 a new twin-siren fog signal was installed, sounded through a pair of 'Rayleigh trumpets', together with a new set of 24 h.p. Hornsby oil engines in the engine room providing compressed air.

The light was electrified in 1960 when the lighthouse was connected to mains electricity. At the same time a new motor-driven optic was installed, providing an 800,000 candlepower light visible at a distance of 18 nautical miles (33 km; 21 mi), and a new twin-diaphone fog signal was installed, the Rayleigh trumpets being replaced by a set of rectangular exponential horns. Compressed air was provided by a pair of Reavell compressor sets (one diesel, the other electric) supplied by Petters Ltd (who also provided a standby generator in case the mains supply failed).

== The new lighthouse ==
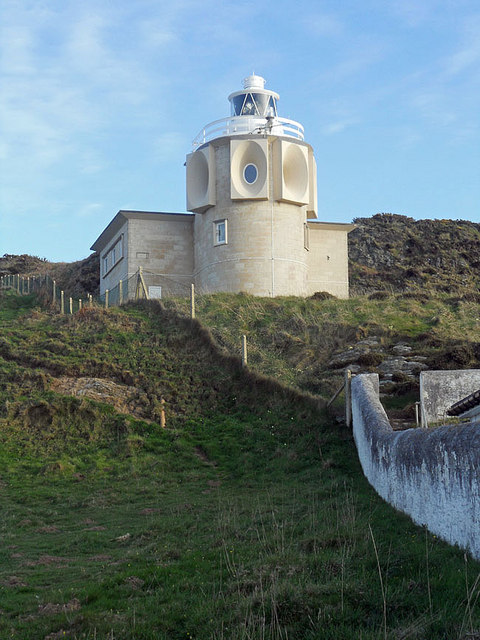
The new lighthouse had sounders for the fog horn integrated into its structure.

In September 1972 the headland on which the lighthouse stood subsided making the structure dangerous. Trinity House used an old light tower from nearby Braunton Sands for two years whilst a new structure was rebuilt further inland. This was completed in 1974 at a cost of £71,000 and is currently in use. It was designed by an in-house team led by Ian Clingan, and built by T. R. Yeo & Sons (a local firm of contractors). Much equipment was reused from the old lighthouse, including the 1960 optic and diaphone fog signal. The new lighthouse stood 11 metres tall, had a light intensity of 800,000 candelas and could be seen for 24 nmi (44 km). The sector light was also retained, shone from a window at the base of the tower.

The new Bull Point Lighthouse was opened by Captain David Tibbitts (deputy master of Trinity House) on 25 July 1975. It was classed as a 'husband and wife' station: the light and foghorn were fully automatic from the start, but maintained by a resident keeper and his wife. The old lighthouse and engine room were demolished, but the adjacent keepers' cottages were retained and used by Trinity House as holiday accommodation for its staff.

The triple F-type diaphone foghorn was switched off in 1988, but inside the redundant equipment remains intact. The lighthouse was automated and no longer staffed in 1995. The range of the light was reduced in 2025 to 18 nautical miles (33 km; 21 mi).

The site can be reached by an adjacent public footpath, although the lighthouse compound itself is private property and not accessible to visitors. The old lighthouse keepers' cottages are now being let out to tourists as self-catering holiday establishments.

== Gallery ==
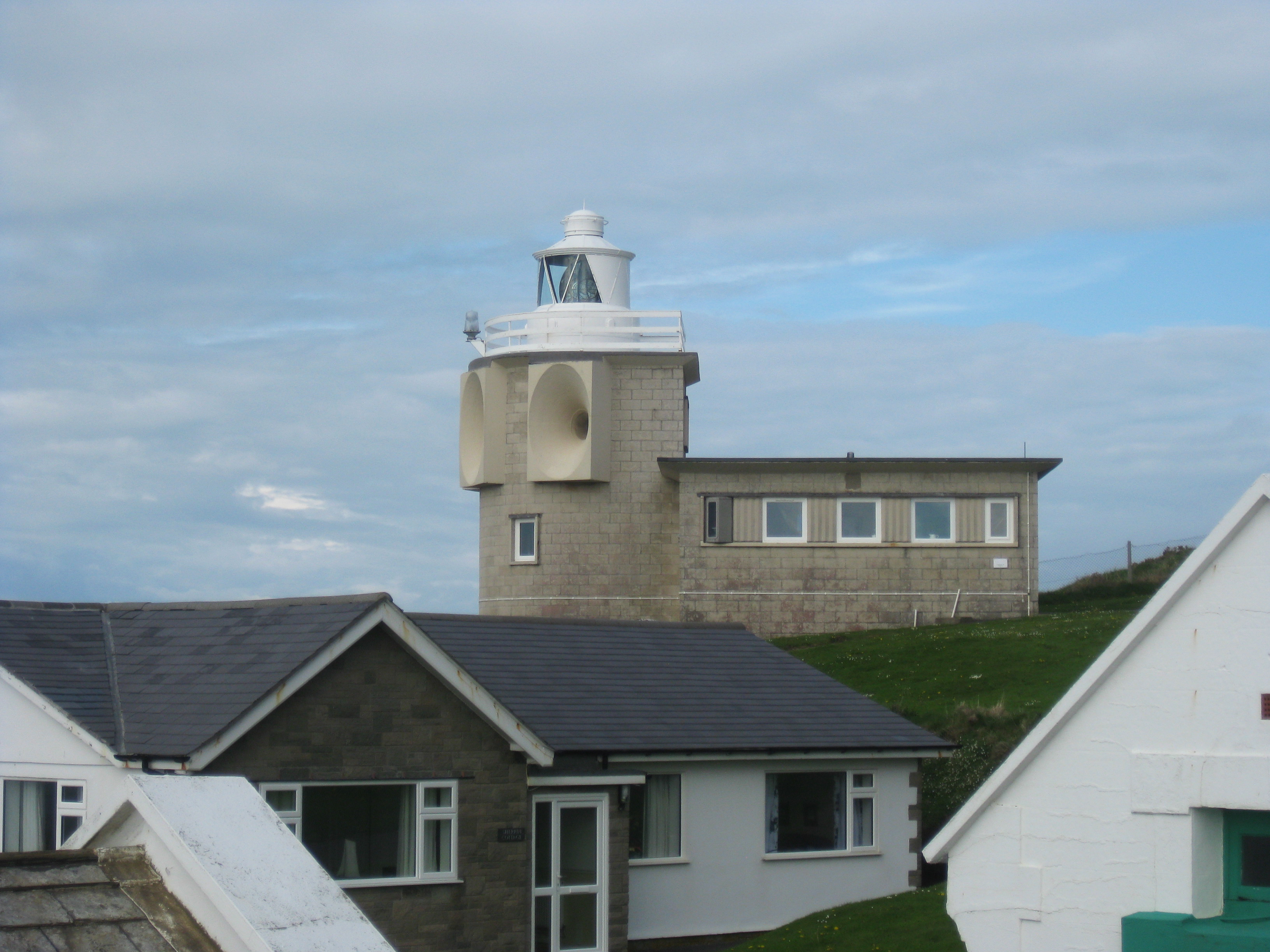
Bull Point Lighthouse (with engine room attached and the new keeper's cottage in the foreground).

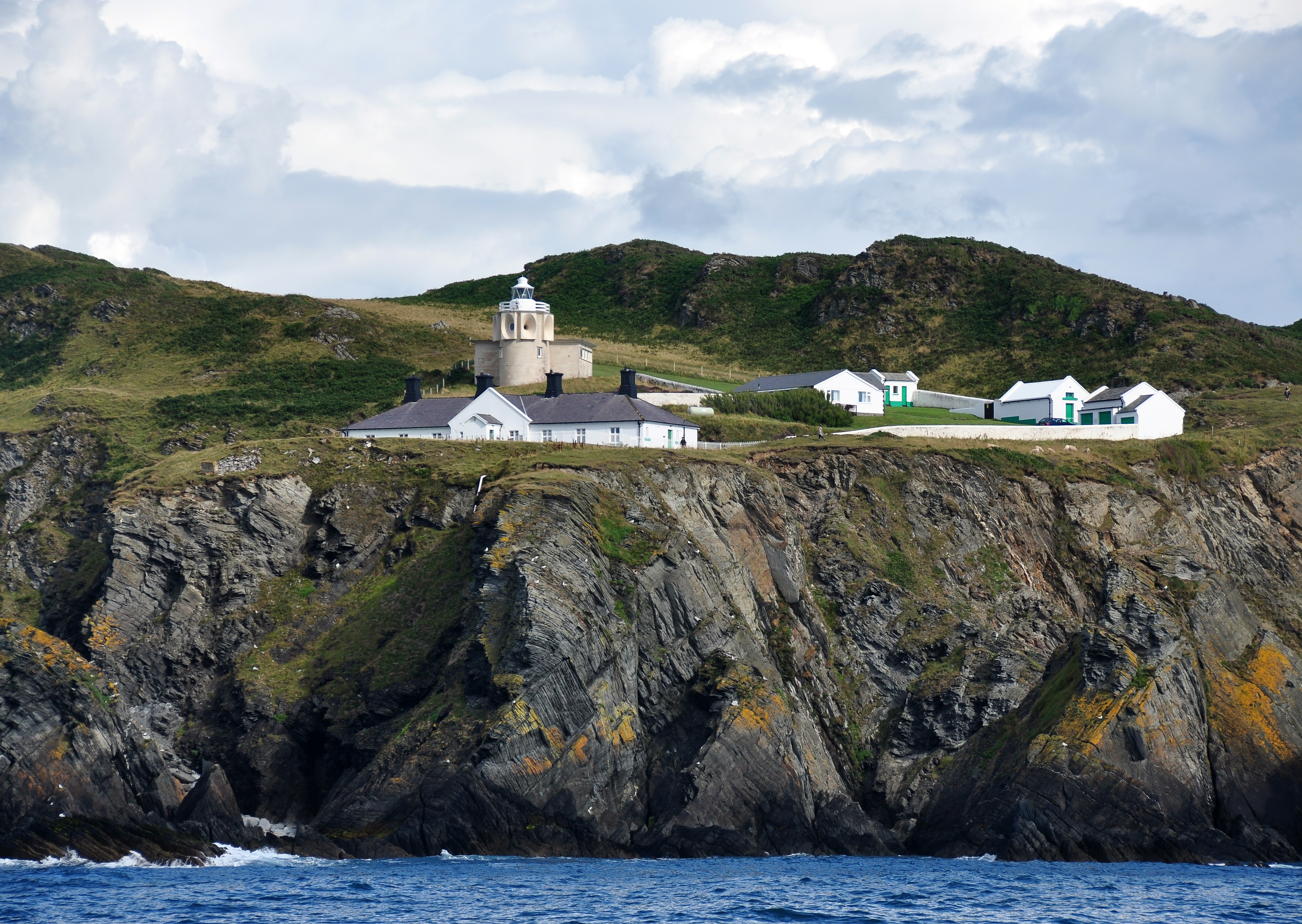
The lighthouse compound viewed from the sea.

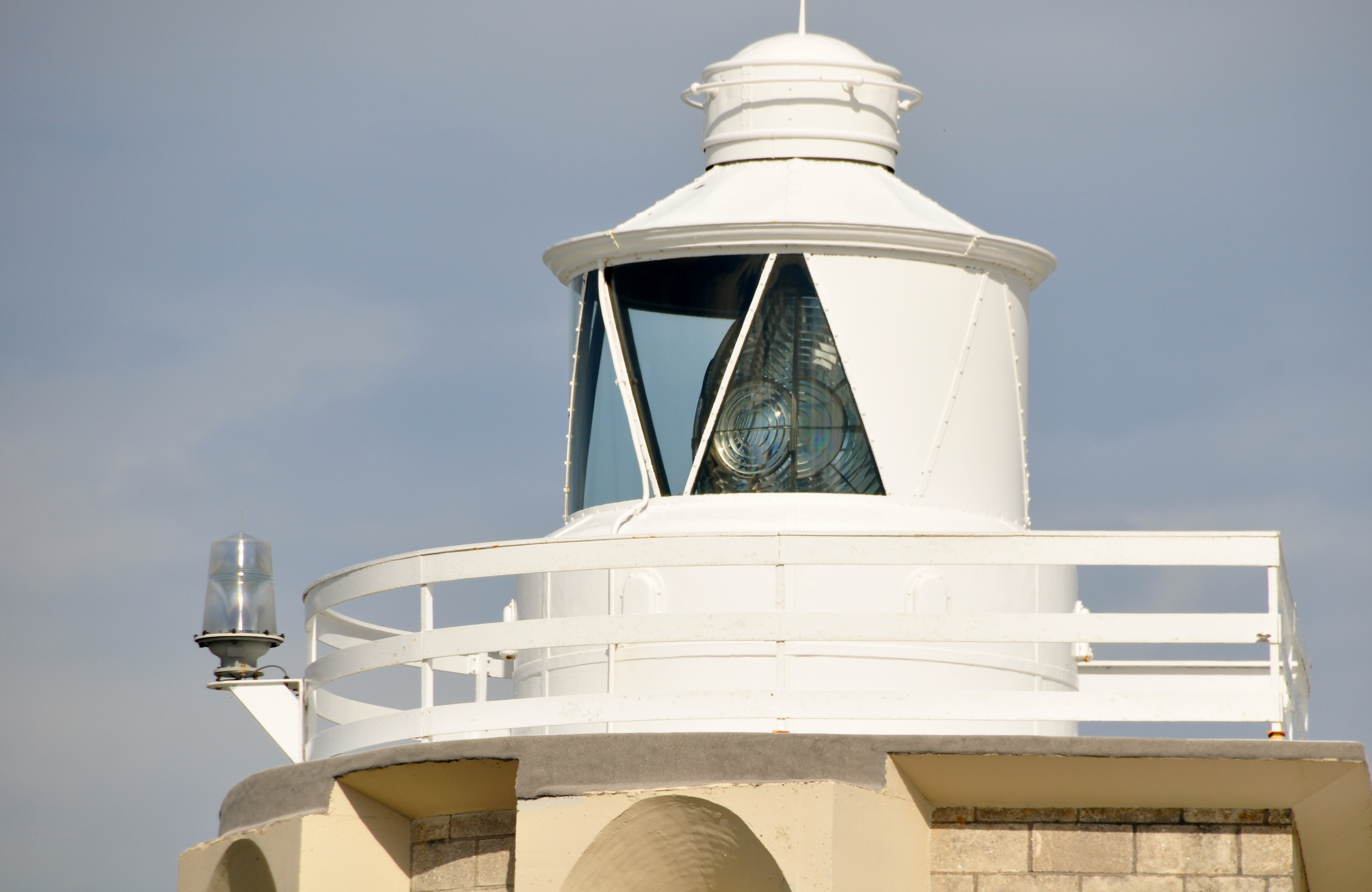
Close-up, showing the lantern and lens (centre) and emergency battery light mounted on the gallery (left).

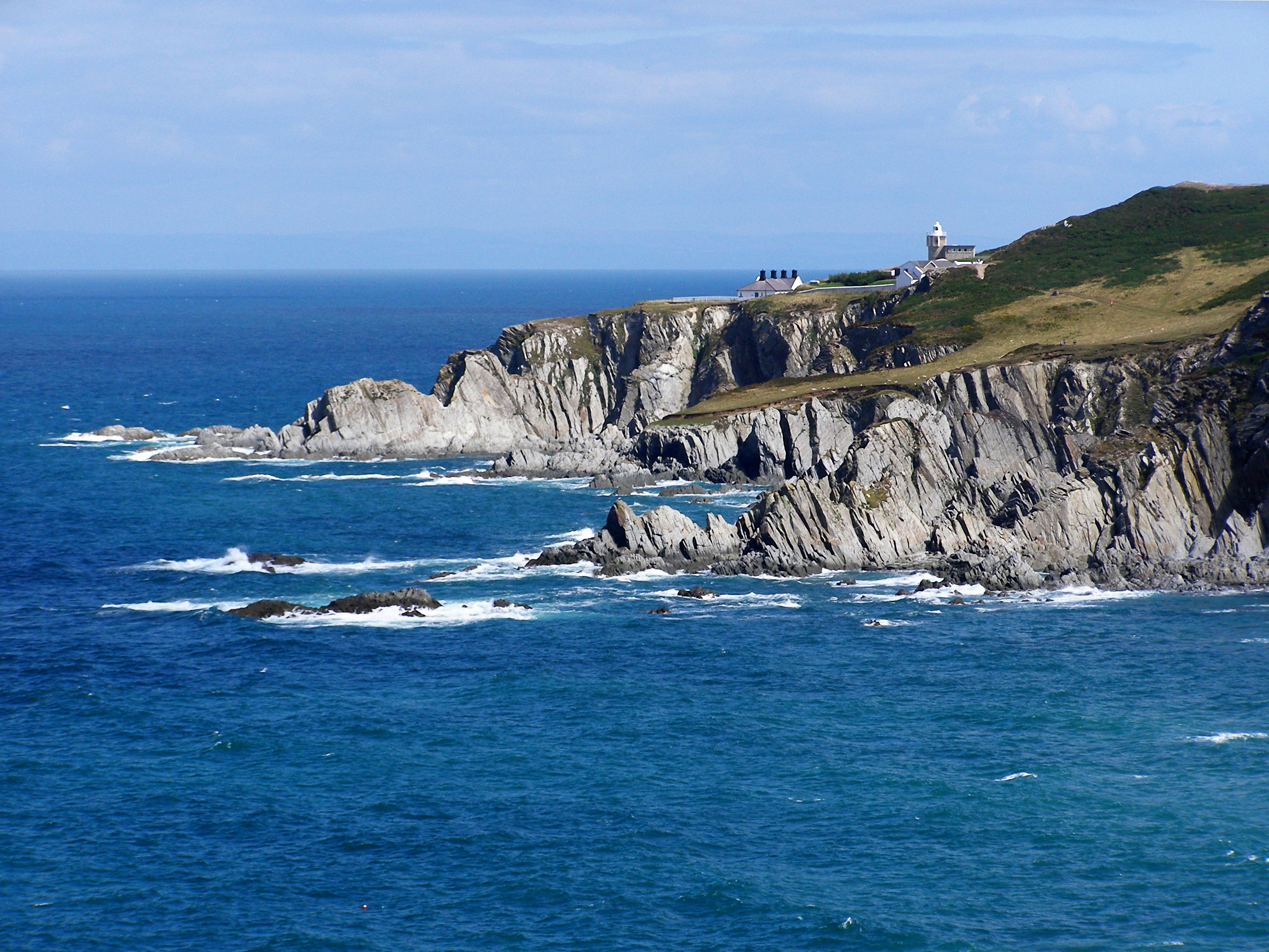
View of the lighthouse from Morte Point

== See also ==
- List of lighthouses in England
