= Mortehoe =

Village in Devon, England

Coordinates: 51°11′07″N 4°12′32″W

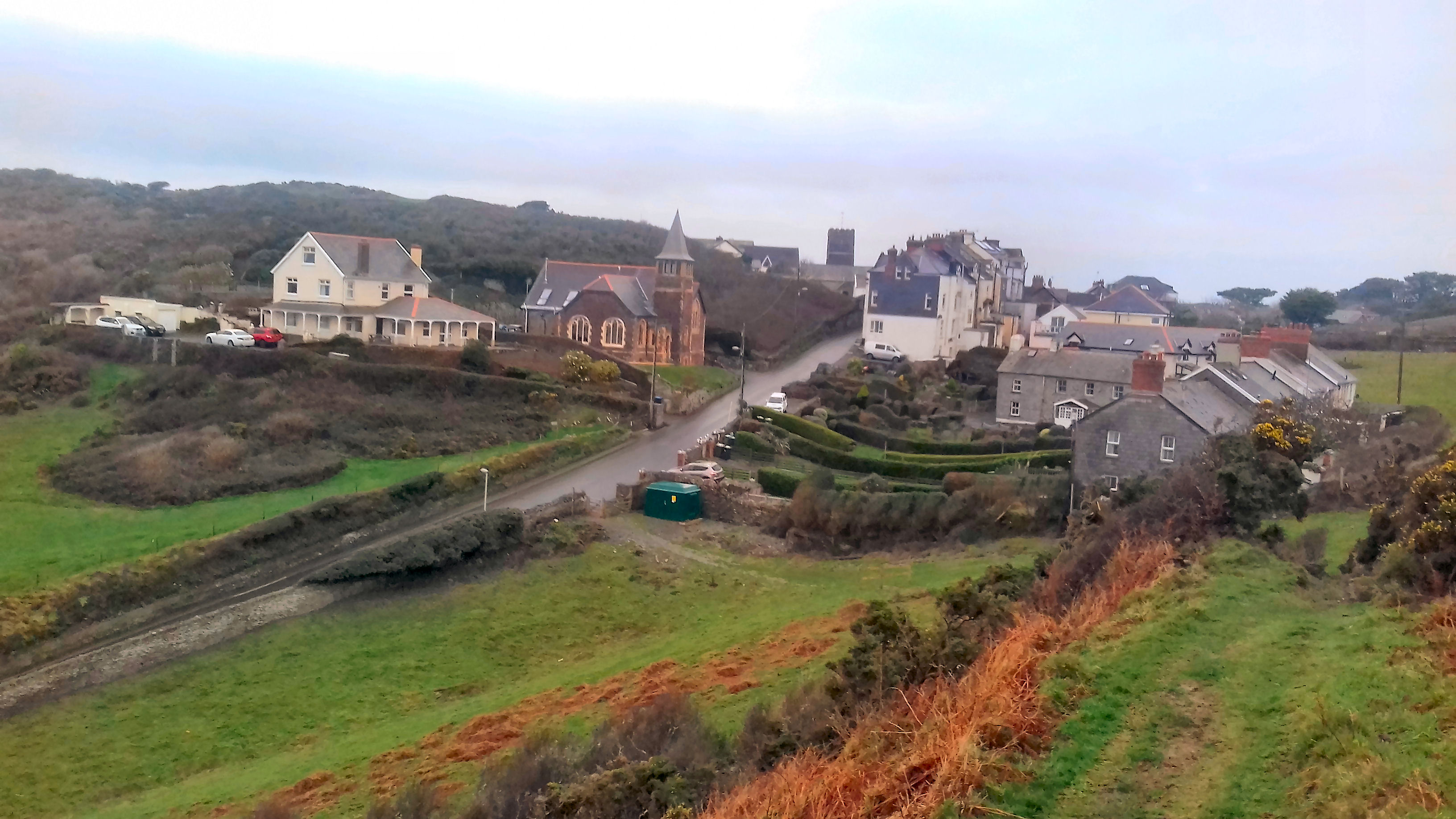
- Mortehoe

- Location within Devon
- Population: 1,637
- District: North Devon
- Shire county: Devon
- Region: South West
- Country: England
- Sovereign state: United Kingdom
- Post town: Woolacombe
- Postcode district: EX34
- Police: Devon and Cornwall
- Fire: Devon and Somerset
- Ambulance: South Western
- UK Parliament: North Devon

Mortehoe (/ˈmɔːrthoʊ/) is a village and former manor on the north coast of Devon, England. It lies 10 miles north-west of Barnstaple, near Woolacombe and Lee Bay, and is sited in a valley within the hilly sand-dune-like land behind Morte Point, almost directly above Woolacombe. The parish population at the 2011 census was 1,637.

== History ==
Mortehoe can trace its origins back to the Domesday Book of 1086 and beyond. Always a farming community, in former years it was a base for smugglers and wreckers. Since the coming of the railway in the 19th century, notably the Ilfracombe Branch Line, Mortehoe became much more dependent on tourism, with numerous camp sites and holiday camps in the vicinity.

== Geology ==
Mortehoe, like most of the surrounding area, is built on a band of Devonian Slates, Sandstones and Igneous rocks such as Basalt. This gives the area a rugged and rocky quality which is typical of North Devon.

== Transport links ==
Mortehoe may be reached by road from two directions: either a steep, narrow lane (20% Gradient) that follows the hilly coast north from Woolacombe; or else a twisty, narrow road from the east. There are regular bus services from Woolacombe and Ilfracombe.

The popularity of this remote corner of Devon was boosted by the coming of the railway in 1874. However, Mortehoe station was nearly two miles inland from the village, so Mortehoe was rather less affected by the additional population than its now much larger neighbour, Woolacombe. The Ilfracombe Branch Line railway closed in 1970.

== Places of interest ==
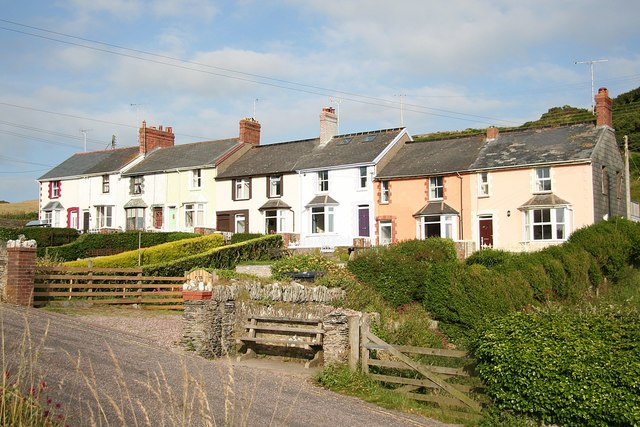
Cottages at Mortehoe

The Mortehoe Museum is located in the Cart Linhay building. On the upper floor is a museum of the history of the most north-westerly tip of North Devon. The museum has displays about the local farming communities, the railway, and the numerous shipwrecks that occurred off the treacherous rocks around the nearby coast. The rebuilding of the heritage site was managed by surveyor, and later landlord, Douglas Victor Watkins.

Bull Point Lighthouse is a short walk along the South West Coast Path from the centre of the village, and Morte Point is also easily accessible.

=== Parish church ===
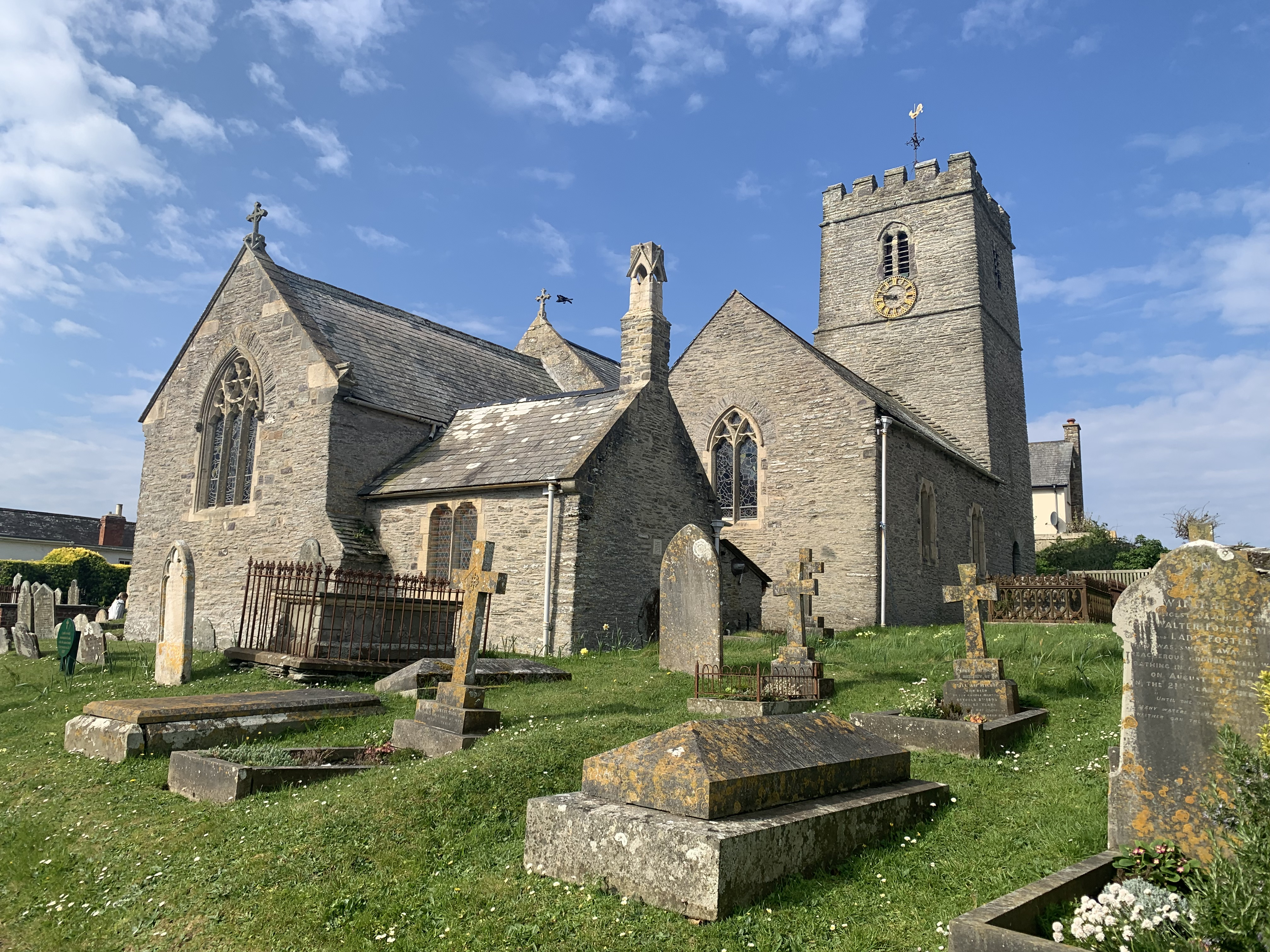
St Mary's Church Morthoe

The village contains the historic church of St Mary's, Morthoe which dates back to Norman times, but has been added to in later years. The bell tower, carved pews and the tomb of Sir William de Tracy are of medieval origin. The later parts of the building date back to the 14th and 16th centuries.

== See also ==
- North Devon Coast Areas of Outstanding Natural Beauty
