= Mary J. Newill =

British artist (1860–1947)

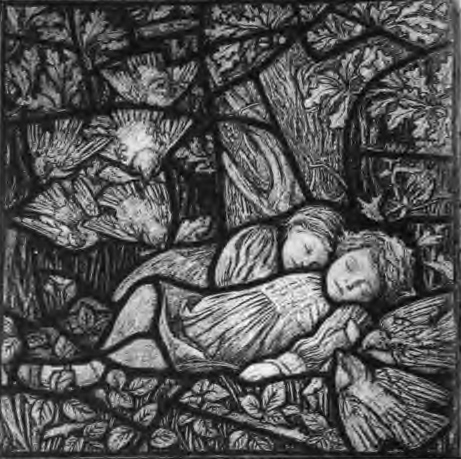
- Babes in the Woods illustration 1893
- Born: Mary Jane Newill; 1860; Shropshire, England
- Died: 1947 (aged 86–87)
- Education: Birmingham School of Art
- Movement: Arts and Crafts Movement

Mary Jane Newill (1860–1947) was an English painter, embroiderer, teacher, book illustrator and stained glass designer associated with the Arts and Crafts Movement. As a stained glass artist, she was a disciple of stained glass designer, Selwyn Image. Newill was a member of the Birmingham Group, an informal group of artists and craftsment that worked in Birmingham, England.

== Biography ==
Mary Jane Newill was born in Shropshire, England in 1860. She studied at the Birmingham School of Art in the 1880s and 1890s. Fellow students included Charles March Gere, Sidney Meteyard, and Henry Payne. Awarded a John Skirrow Wright scholarship in 1880, Newell continued her studies in Paris. She returned to Birmingham and was hired to teach embroidery and design at the Birmingham School of Art in 1892, a position she occupied until 1919.

In 1893, Newill's Babes in the Woods stained glass panel cartoon was displayed at the annual Arts and Crafts Exhibition Society in London, only the second stained glass design by a female artist to be exhibited, and the first by a woman who later became a successful commercial artist. The drawing was later used by Christopher Whall as an illustration in his influential manual, Stained Glass Work (1905).

Newill's drawings are similar to her mentor, Selwyn Image's work. "Although her subsequent stained glass work developed in interesting and original ways, it always retained echoes of Image's graphic simplification in the drawing." Newill had her own studio in central Birmingham by 1906, at a time when there were few women working in the profession. She was a designer for the Bromsgrove Guild of Applied Arts and a member of the Birmingham Group and of the Arts and Crafts Exhibition Society. Most of Newill’s stained glass work was commissioned and purchased for private residences. Two public examples of her work are a window in the lady chapel of St. Mary and St. Ambrose Church in Edgbaston, and a window in Wrockwardine Church in Shropshire.

Embroidery by Newill and her students was displayed at the International Exhibition of 1906 in Christchurch, New Zealand. Some of her embroidery projects were commissioned for churches. Examples of her needlework are held in the collections of the Victoria and Albert Museum and of the Birmingham Museum and Art Gallery.

== Image gallery ==
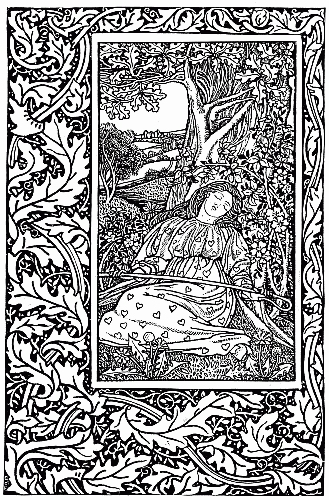
Illustration from Nursery Songs and Rhymes (1895)

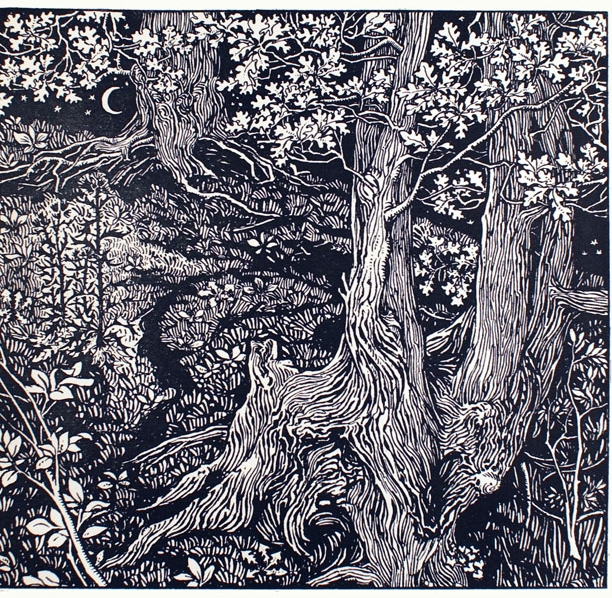
Illustration from The Yellow Book 9 (1896)

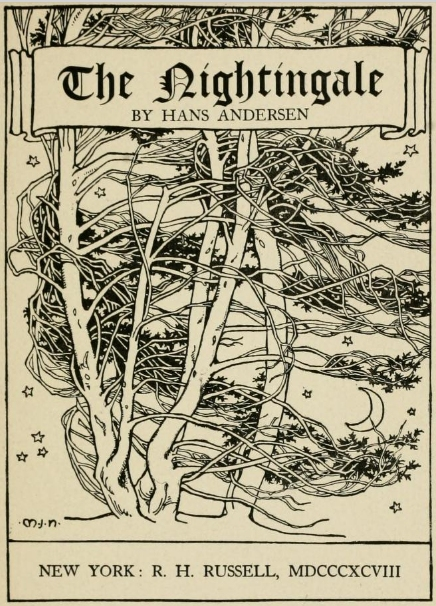
Frontispiece, The Nightingale (1898)

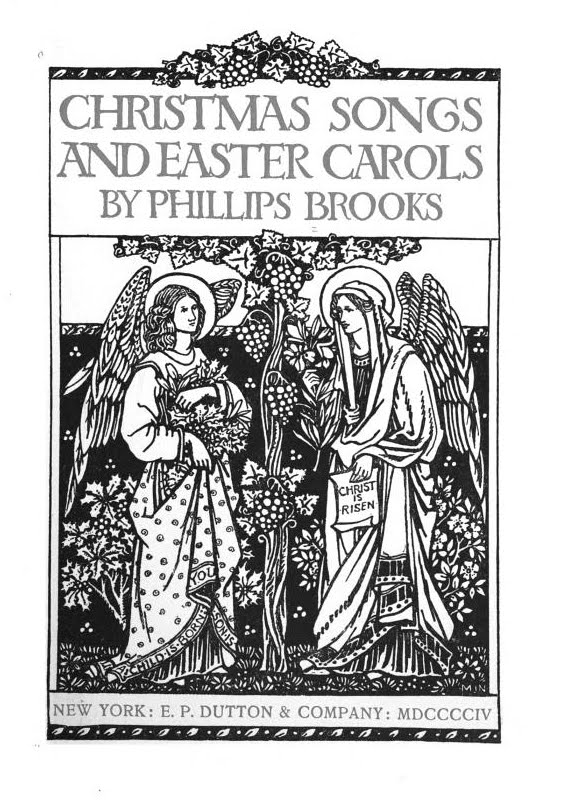
Frontispiece, Christmas Songs and Easter Carols (1903)

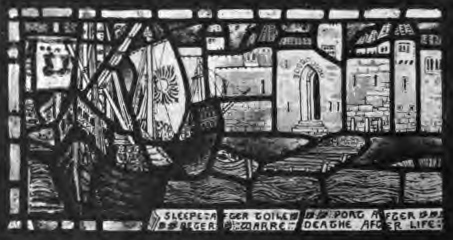
Illustration from Stained Glass Work "Sleep after Toile 2" (1905)
