= Felicissimus =

Leader of uprising of mint workers against Emperor Aurelian (c.271)

Felicissimus (died 271?) was a public officer in ancient Rome, during the reign of Emperor Aurelian. He is known for leading an uprising of mint workers against the Emperor, though he was defeated and killed, possibly in 274, but more probably in 271.

== Mint workers revolt ==
Felicissimus was a rationalis, the chief of the state treasury. One of the responsibilities of the rationalis was to administer the imperial mints. The workers of the mint in Rome had been engaged in adulterating the coinage for their own profit. This involved the Divus Claudius coin, which was issued during Aurelian's early reign to establish his right to be the successor of Claudius. Felicissimus was held responsible and when he was challenged by Aurelian, he incited the mint workers to revolt. In the uprising that followed, it is reported that the workers were massacred while 7,000 soldiers were killed (Aurelius Victor xxxv 6; Historia Augusta, Aurelianus, xxxviii 2–4). The battle took place on the Caelian Hill. It is possible that this uprising was somehow connected with the senatorial and equestrian classes, as Aurelian executed several senators.

The fact that the mint of Rome was inactive for a short time before the monetary reform of 274 could be a consequence of this revolt, and the poor quality of the coinage at the beginning of Aurelian's reign supports the suggestion that the workers at the mint were adulterating the coinage. Aurelian chose Gaius Valerius Sabinus as Felicissimus' successor and the mint at Rome was transferred to Mediolanum.

== Sources ==
- Aurelius Victor, De Caesaribus, 35,6;
- Eutropius, Breviarium historiae Romanae, ix,14;
- Historia Augusta, Aurelianus, 38.2;
