= Gaius Valarius Sabinus =

Gaius Valarius Sabinus was a public officer in Ancient Rome, during the reign of Emperor Aurelian. After the revolt of Felicissimus and the mint workers in the spring of 271, Aurelian appointed Sabinus as the new finance minister. He was first given the title agens vice rationalis ("acting in the place of rationalis"). This suggest he was given the office in the immediate aftermath of the riots. Later his position was confirmed officially, when he was given the title of v.p. rationalis.

Scholars believe that Sabinus was largely responsible for Aurelian's new financial and monetary policies. Sabinus set up his headquarters at Ticinum, where Aurelian's largest new mint was also located.

== Sources ==
- Watson Alaric (1999), Aurelian and the Third Century, Routledge, London.
