= Morte Point =

Headland on the north coast of Devon, England

Coordinates: 51.188°N 4.211°W

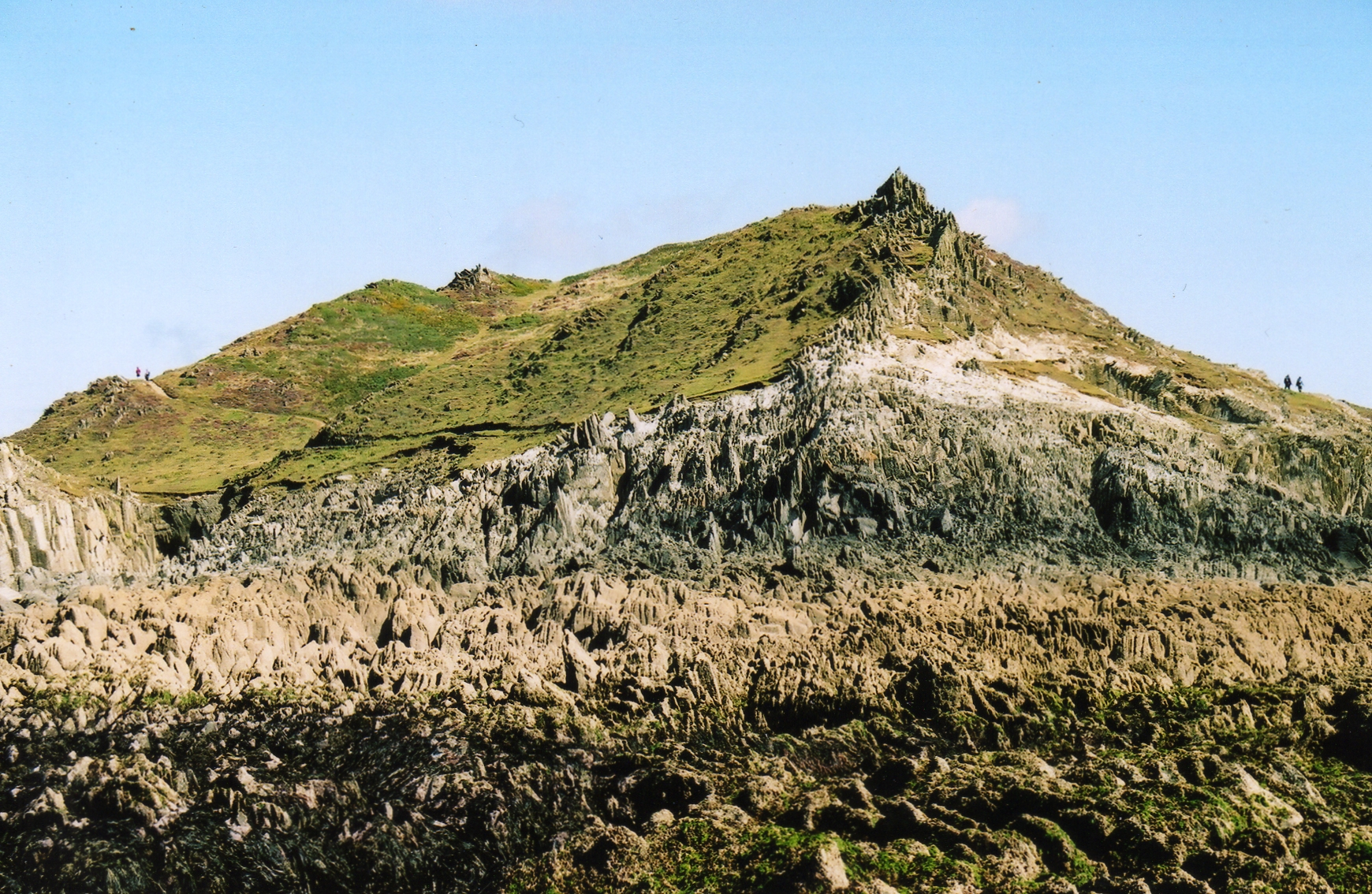
Morte Point seen from the west at low tide.

Morte Point is a peninsula on the north west coast of Devon, England, belonging to the National Trust. To the east is the village of Mortehoe and to the south is the seaside resort of Woolacombe.

In the summer season, tractor and trailer rides are operated from the Mortehoe Heritage Centre onto the point for visitors to view the seals that live on the northern side.

== History ==
Morte Point (literally meaning death-point) is notorious for being the site of many shipwrecks. Five ships were wrecked in the winter of 1852 alone; Bull Point Lighthouse was built just 1¼ miles (2 km) north east of the point. One shipwreck, a ship carrying a cargo of live pigs, gave a small cove to the south of the point the name of Grunta Beach (most of the pigs survived; one is supposed to have lived wild on seaweed for a year). The Royal National Lifeboat Institution built a lifeboat station at Morte Bay in 1871, although the crews always came from the station at Ilfracombe on a carriage when the boat was needed. It proved difficult to launch into strong winds blowing onto its west-facing beach and so the station was closed in May 1900.
