= Woolacombe =

Village in Devon, England

Coordinates: 51.172°N 4.207°W

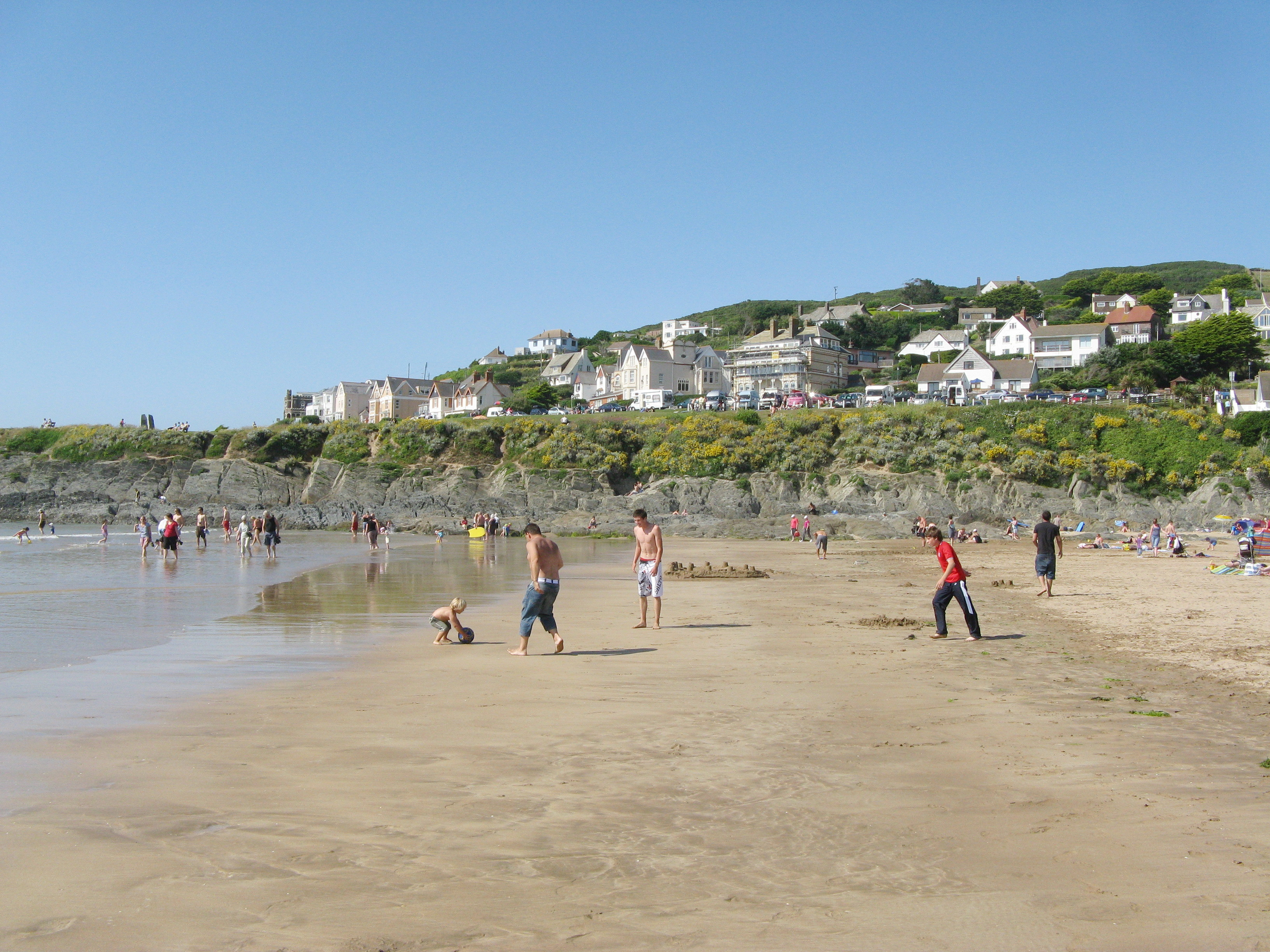
- Woolacombe beach and village

- Location within Devon
- Population: 697
- OS grid reference: SS457438
- District: North Devon
- Shire county: Devon
- Region: South West
- Country: England
- Sovereign state: United Kingdom
- Post town: WOOLACOMBE
- Postcode district: EX34
- Dialling code: 01271
- Police: Devon and Cornwall
- Fire: Devon and Somerset
- Ambulance: South Western
- UK Parliament: North Devon

Woolacombe (/ˈwʊləkəm/) is a seaside resort on the coast of North Devon, England, which lies at the mouth of a valley (or "combe") in the parish of Mortehoe. The beach is 2 miles (3.2 km) long, sandy, gently sloping and faces the Atlantic Ocean near the western limit of the Bristol Channel.

== Tourism ==
Woolacombe is a popular destination for surfing and family holidays and is part of the North Devon Coast Area of Outstanding Natural Beauty. The beach has been managed by Parkin Estates since 1948 and has over the years been recognised as one of the best beaches in Europe. It won the title of Britain's Best Beach in the Coast Magazine Awards 2012 and was awarded the same prize of Britain's Best Beach in 2015 by TripAdvisor, also ranking in their polls as 4th in Europe and 13th best in the world. In 2021 it was named Beach of the Year by The Times and Sunday Times. The beach water quality is monitored regularly by the Environment Agency and was rated excellent from 2016 to 2025.

The winter population is around 700 but during the summer large numbers of people come to the village for their holidays, including for surfing. There are many hotels, holiday flats, holiday parks, campsites and bed and breakfast establishments, and most of the entertainment opportunities are aimed at tourists. The village is served by a local independent pharmacy and a satellite doctors surgery. There is a crazy golf course in the centre of the village, which formerly featured North Devon landmarks for the holes, with model buildings constructed from the types of stone found in the local area, and was rebuilt as a pirate-themed crazy golf course in 2010.

The South West Coast Path runs through the village, with access to the North Devon coast, including the walk out to and around Morte Point. There are several establishments in the area that provide pony trekking, and riding along Woolacombe Sands.

=== Awards ===
- Family Resort of the Year – Gold Award (England for Excellence – 1999):
  "A beach that is everyone's ideal - golden and sandy - perfect for a traditional bucket and spade holiday"
- Best Beach (2nd place) (The Observer – 2000)
- ENCAMS Seaside Award (2003)
- Tidy Britain Seaside Award (2005)
- Blue Flag beach (2005, 2006, 2007 and others)
- Coast Magazine Awards 2012 - Winner - Britain's Best Beach
- TripAdvisor Best British beach 2015
- TripAdvisor 4th Best Beach in Europe 2015
- The Times and Sunday Times Beach of the Year 2021

== Geology and wildlife ==
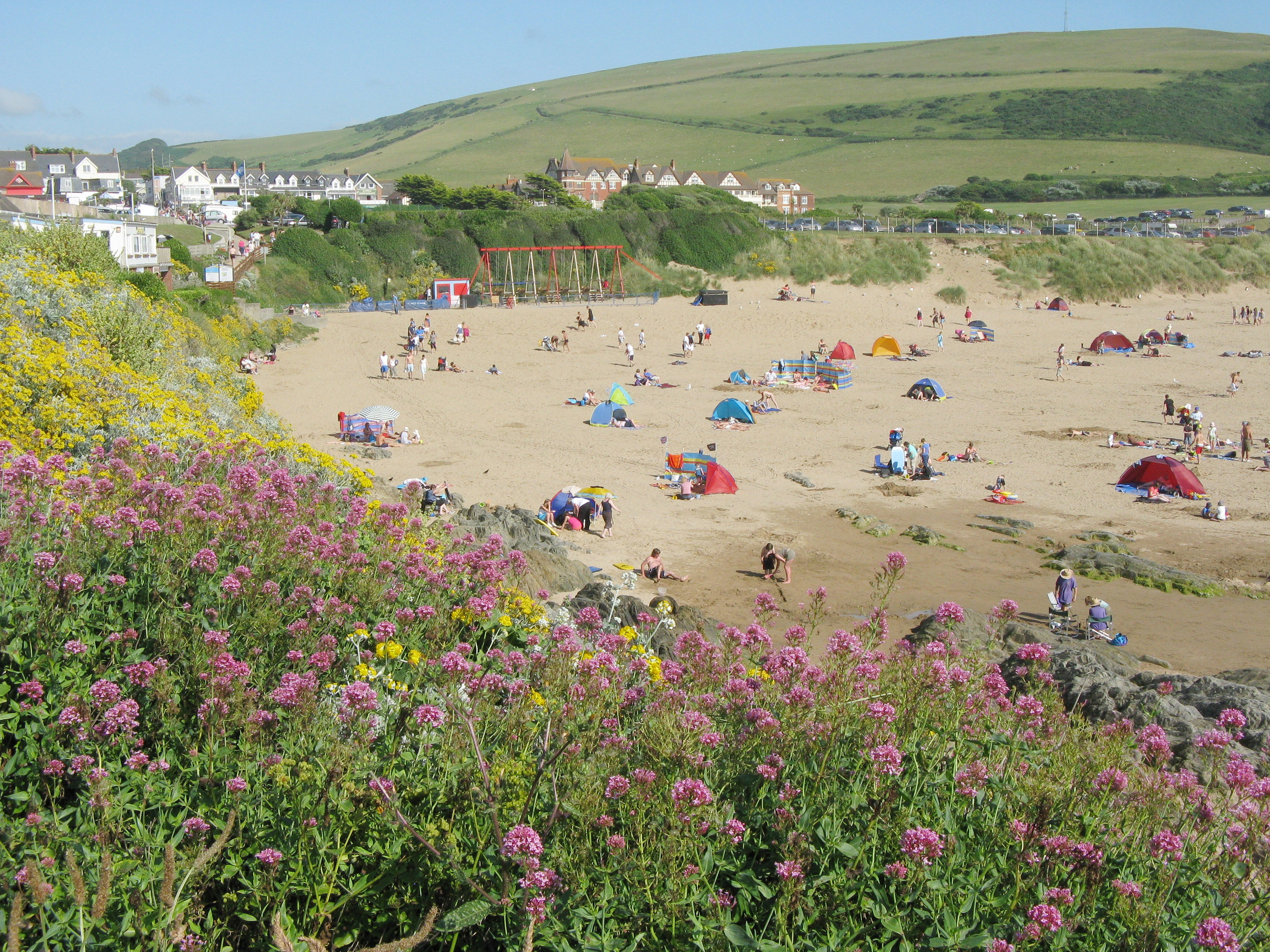
The beach at Woolacombe

Woolacombe lies within the North Devon Coast Area of Outstanding Natural Beauty, which is renowned for its dramatic coastal cliffs and landscape. Due to Atlantic waves, the swell is large making it a good for surfing.

The beach is flanked by sloping sand dunes which are popular for climbing on, and can be observed undergoing biological succession - The dunes are becoming populated by marram grass and sea spurge at the top of the dunes.

Across from the beach, there are views of Lundy Island. Woolacombe has low cliffs at either end of the beach which are home to rare maritime heathland. Much of the countryside close to the village is owned and cared for by the National Trust. The coast itself is part of the North Devon Voluntary Marine Conservation Area because of its diverse and rare species.

== History ==
Like a number of British beaches, it is privately owned and until 1948 the beach and much of the surrounding land was owned by the Chichester family, who acquired it in 1133 during the reign of King Henry I. When Lady Rosalie Chichester, the last of the line, died in 1949 it had been in her family's possession for over 800 years. On her death the Chichester's land in Woolacombe and Mortehoe and the family estate at Arlington near Barnstaple had been willed to the National Trust. However, the beach and some surrounding land had previously been purchased by Stanley Parkin. Ray Parkin became chairman of Parkin Estates in 1995, until his death in 2021.

During the Second World War, the U.S. Army Assault Training Centre was based at Woolacombe, where thousands of small boat crews and infantry practised amphibious landing assaults on the beach in preparation for the Invasion of Normandy, part of Operation Overlord. The long flat shape of the beach and the conditions of the hinterland were considered to closely resemble the Omaha Beach landing area.

There is a stone memorial to the soldiers, dedicated in 1992, sited on the grassy headland at the northern end of the beach.

== Transport ==
A bus service runs from the village to Barnstaple, Ilfracombe, Combe Martin and Mortehoe. The village had a joint railway station with Mortehoe on the Ilfracombe Branch Line which closed in 1970. There also used to be a locally operated bus by one of the holiday park companies which ferries holidaymakers from their four caravan and camping parks to the beach which helps ease congestion at peak times, until one of the four was sold and the bus service stopped.

== Religion ==
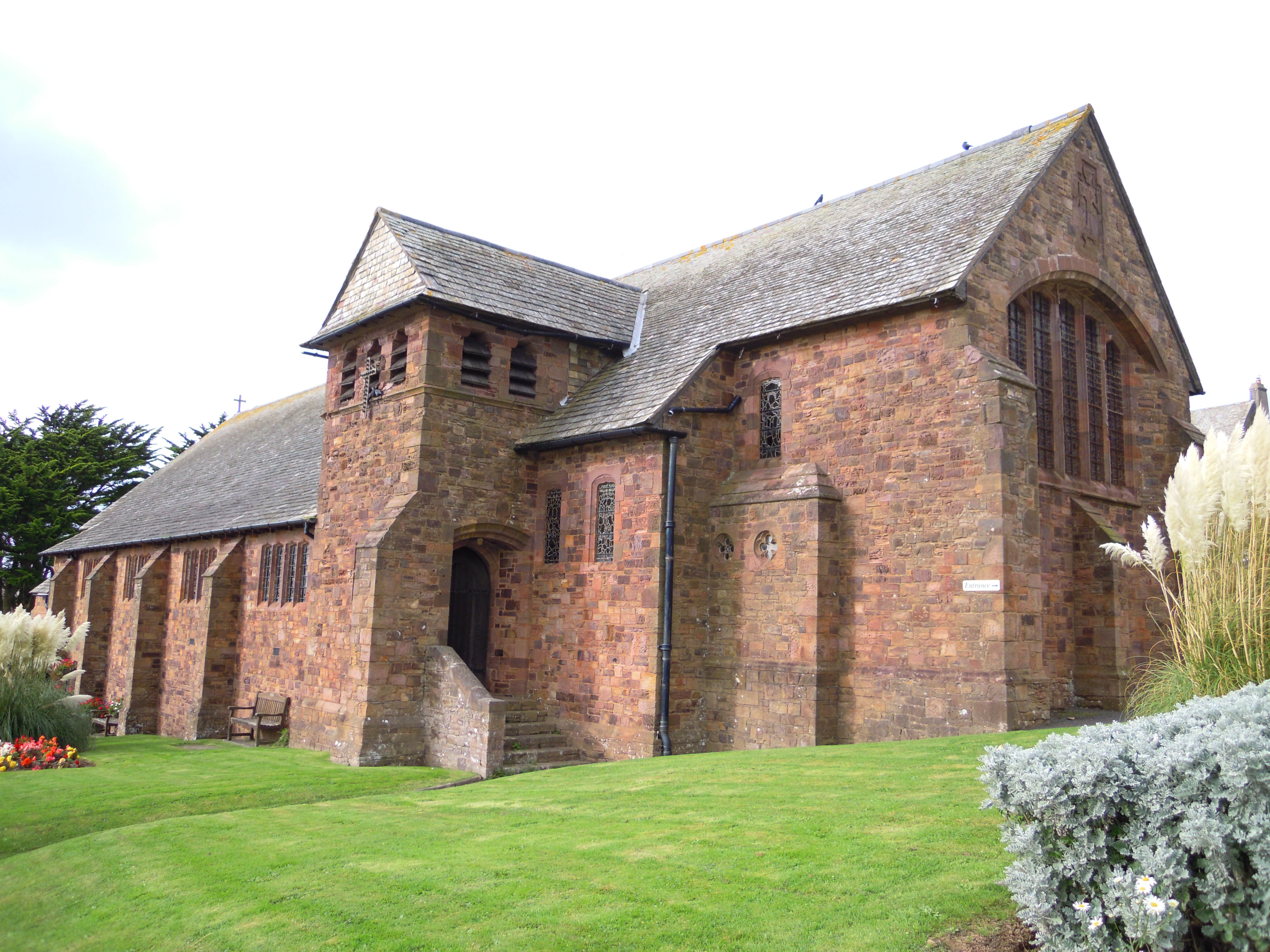
The Church of St Sabinus was designed by W. D. Caröe

There are several places of worship in Woolacombe, all Christian. The Anglican Church of St Sabinus, designed by the architect W. D. Caröe and consecrated in 1912, is sited on the main road into the village centre. It was built to cater for the tourists visiting the village every year after the opening of the local railway station in 1874. The church is dedicated to St Sabinus, a canonised Italian bishop.

During the 1960s and early 1970s, Counties Evangelistic Work conducted "beach missions" on the sands at Woolacombe each summer, led by the evangelist Dennis Pierce of Barnstaple. This was part of his wider work during the year across Devon.

A branch of the California-based Calvary Chapel was established in 2001, meeting at the time in the village hall, now meeting in the old Methodist Church, Beach Lane; and in 2002 the chapel organised the first Creation Fest, a free Christian music festival, held annually on the outskirts of the village until 2008, when the festival was moved to Cornwall. The former chapel was designed by Edward Collins of Barnstaple.

== See also ==
- Mortehoe and Woolacombe railway station
