= List of shipwrecks in December 1830 =

The list of shipwrecks in December 1830 includes ships sunk, foundered, grounded, or otherwise lost during December 1830.

== 1 December ==
List of shipwrecks: 1 December 1830
Ship	State	Description
Catharina	flag unknown	The ship ran aground on Texel, North Holland, Netherlands and was abandoned by her crew. She was on a voyage from Rostock to Amsterdam, North Holland. Catharina was refloated the next day.
Lively	United Kingdom	The fishing smack was wrecked on the Cork Sand, in the North Sea off Harwich, Essex. Her three crew survived.
Oriel	United Kingdom	The ship was driven ashore at Stornoway, Ayrshire.
Thames	United Kingdom	The ship departed from Chester, Cheshire for London. No further trace, presumed foundered with the loss of all hands.

== 2 December ==
List of shipwrecks: 2 December 1830
Ship	State	Description
Beinherdina	flag unknown	The ship was lost at the mouth of the River Tees.
Mary	United Kingdom	The ship departed from Dartmouth, Devon for Liverpool, Lancashire. No further trace, presumed foundered with the loss of all hands.
Unity	United Kingdom	The ship was wrecked near Waterford.

== 3 December ==
List of shipwrecks: 3 December 1830
Ship	State	Description
Kitty	United Kingdom	The ship was driven ashore near Kingstown, County Dublin and severely damaged. She was on a voyage from Whitehaven, Cumberland to Cardiff, Glamorgan.

== 5 December ==
List of shipwrecks: 5 December 1830
Ship	State	Description
Alpha	United Kingdom	The ship departed from North Shields, County Durham for London. She subsequently foundered in the North Sea with the loss of all hands.
Bon Pere	France	The brig en route from Guadeloupe to Le Havre with sugar, was wrecked on Towan Beach while trying to weather Zone Point and reach Falmouth, Cornwall. The crew of ten survived.
Brothers	United Kingdom	The ship was wrecked near The Lizard, Cornwall. Her crew were rescued. She was on a voyage from Bridgwater, Somerset to Hull, Yorkshire.
Economy	United Kingdom	The brig was driven ashore and wrecked at Castletownshend, County Cork with the loss of all hands. She was on a voyage from Limerick to Bristol, Gloucestershire.
General Jackson	United States	The steamboat suffered a boiler explosion and sank at Savannah, Georgia with some loss of life. She was on a voyage from Charleston, South Carolina to Augusta, Maine.
Good Hope	United Kingdom	The ship was driven ashore at Giltar Point, Pembrokeshire. Her crew were rescued. She was on a voyage from Llanelli, Glamorgan to Barnstaple, Devon.
Quixote	(United Kingdom of Great Britain and Ireland) Jersey	The brig was wrecked in the Atlantic Ocean (48°00′N 9°13′W) with the loss of three of her nine crew. Four more died before 13 December, when the survivors were rescued by Ceres (France). Quixote was on a voyage from Santa Lucia de Tirajana, Canary Islands, Spain to Liverpool, Lancashire.
HMS Thetis	Royal Navy	The Leda-class frigate struck a rock off Cabo Frio, Brazil and foundered with the loss of 20 of her crew.

== 6 December ==
List of shipwrecks: 6 December 1830
Ship	State	Description
Active	United Kingdom	The ship was wrecked on the Harrypenlo Rocks, in the Irish Sea off the coast of Anglesey with the loss of all hands.
Adeline	United Kingdom	The ship was driven ashore and wrecked near Drogheda, County Louth. She was on a voyage from Liverpool, Lancashire to New Orleans, Louisiana, United States.
Ann	United Kingdom	The ship ran aground on the Harrypenlo Rocks. She refloated but consequently foundered. Her crew were rescued.
Bacchus	United Kingdom	The brig was wrecked on the Gull Rock, in Gerrans Bay, Cornwall with the loss of all hands.
Briton	United Kingdom	The ship was wrecked near Waterford.
Brothers	United Kingdom	The schooner was driven ashore and wrecked at Coverack, Cornwall. Her crew were rescued. She was on a voyage from Bridgwater, Somerset to Hull, Yorkshire.
Brothers and Sisters	United Kingdom	The ship was driven ashore at Milford Haven, Pembrokeshire.
Catherine Margaretha	Denmark	The galiot was driven ashore and wrecked at Portholland, Cornwall. She was on a voyage from Liverpool to Hamburg.
Charity	United Kingdom	The brig was wrecked on Drakes Island, Devon. She was on a voyage from Newfoundland, British North America to London.
Charlotta	Sweden	The ship struck the Barber Sand, in the North Sea off the coast of Norfolk, United Kingdom. She refloated at was driven ashore at Caister-on-Sea, Norfolk.
Charlotte	United Kingdom	The ship foundered in Lidstap Bay. She was on a voyage from Llanelli, Glamorgan to Bideford, Devon.
Despatch	United Kingdom	The ship was driven ashore at Penzance. She was later refloated.
Duke of Kent	United Kingdom	The ship foundered whilst on a voyage from London to Terceira, Spain. Her crew were rescued by Royal Charlotte (United Kingdom).
Eagle	United Kingdom	The ship was wrecked on the Herd Sand, in the North Sea off North Shields, County Durham. Her crew were rescued. She was on a voyage from Riga, Russia to London.
Ebenezer	United Kingdom	The brig was driven ashore at Penzance, Cornwall. Her crew were rescued. She was refloated on 13 December and taken in to Penzance.
Eleanor	United Kingdom	The schooner was driven ashore and wrecked at Newlyn, Cornwall.
Eleanor	United Kingdom	The ship was driven ashore and wrecked at Penzance.
Emulous	United Kingdom	The brig was wrecked on Drakes Island. She was on a voyage from Liverpool, Lancashire to King's Lynn, Norfolk.
Experiment	Norway	The brig was wrecked in Cawsand Bay, Devon. She was on a voyage from Rochefort, Charente-Maritime to Kristiansand.
Fanny	United Kingdom	The ship was driven ashore near Drogheda.
Fate	United Kingdom	The ship was driven ashore at Grainthorpe, Lincolnshire. She was on a voyage from Memel, Prussia to King's Lynn.
Gomer	United Kingdom	The brig was driven ashore and wrecked at Devil's Point, Devon. She was on a voyage from Buenos Aires, Argentina to London.
Good Intent	United Kingdom	The ship was driven ashore at Youghal, County Cork.
Hawk	United Kingdom	The ship was driven ashore at Milford Haven.
Hawke	United Kingdom	The brig was driven ashore and wrecked near Maenporth, Cornwall with the loss of all hands. She was on a voyage from Cardiff, Glamorgan to London.
Henry	United Kingdom	The ship was driven ashore at Penzance. She was later refloated.
Henty	United Kingdom	The ship was driven ashore and wrecked near Exmouth, Devon. She was on a voyage from London ro Barmouth, Caernarfonshire.
Herefordshire	United Kingdom	The ship was driven ashore at Youghal. She was on a voyage from Liverpool to London
Industry	United Kingdom	The ship was driven ashore at Penzance, Cornwall. She was on a voyage from Lisbon, Portugal to London.
Kingfisher	United Kingdom	The ship sank at Penzance.
La Mayenne	France	The schooner was driven ashore and wrecked on The Towans, Cornwall. Her crew were rescued. She was on a voyage from Cette, Hérault to Rouen, Seine-Inférieure.
Larch	United Kingdom	The brig foundered in the Bristol Channel off Cardiff, Glamorgan. Her crew were rescued.
Le Bon Pére	France	The brig was driven ashore and wrecked on The Towans. Her crew were rescued. She was on a voyage from Guadeloupe to Havre de Grâce, Seine-Inférieure.
Marie	France	The ketch was wrecked on the Pole Sand, in the English Channel off the coast of Devon. Her crew were rescued. She was on a voyage from Bordeaux, Gironde to Dunkirk, Nord.
Matilda and Susan	United Kingdom	The brig was driven ashore and wrecked 3 nautical miles (5.6 km) east of Helford with the loss of all hands. She was on a voyage from Plymouth, Devon to St. Andero, Spain.
Mothers	United Kingdom	The ship was wrecked near The Lizard, Cornwall. Her crew were rescued. She was on a voyage from Bridgwater, Somerset to Hull, Yorkshire.
Northfield	United Kingdom	The sloop was driven ashore and wrecked at Whitby, Yorkshire. Her crew survived.
Pictou	United Kingdom	The brig was driven ashore and wrecked in Creden Bay, County Waterford. Her crew survived. She was on a voyage from Porto, Portugal to Liverpool.
Resolution	United Kingdom	The schooner was driven ashore at Penzance. She was on a voyage from Livorno, Grand Duchy of Tuscany to Leith, Lothian.
St. Nicholas	Russia	The brig was driven ashore and wrecked between Deadman's Point and St Anthony's Point, Cornwall. She was on a voyage from Saint Petersburg to the Mediterranean Sea.
Susan and Matilda	United Kingdom	The schooner was driven ashore and wrecked at Mainporth with the loss of all hands.
Tobacconist	United Kingdom	The ship foundered in the English Channel off Portholland.
Union	United Kingdom	The ship was driven ashore near Drogheda.
Unity	United Kingdom	The ship was driven ashore near Exmouth. She was on a voyage from London to Barmouth, Caernarfonshire.
Victoria	France	The ship was driven ashore and wrecked near Sidmouth, Devon. She was on a voyage from Bordeaux to Dunkirk, Nord.
William Henry	United Kingdom	The brig was wrecked on the Irish coast. Her crew were rescued.

== 7 December ==
List of shipwrecks: 7 December 1830
Ship	State	Description
Sophie	France	The ship was driven ashore and wrecked at Portland, Dorset, United Kingdom with the loss of two of her four crew. She was on a voyage from Havre de Grâce, Seine-Inférieure to Dunkirk, Nord.

== 8 December ==
List of shipwrecks: 8 December 1830
Ship	State	Description
Adeline	United Kingdom	The ship was driven ashore at Drogheda, County Louth. She was on a voyage from Liverpool, Lancashire to New Orleans, Louisiana, United States.
Betsey	United Kingdom	The ship was wrecked near Scarborough, Yorkshire. She was on a voyage from Stockton-on-Tees, County Durham to Whitby, Yorkshire.
Edouard	France	The ship was driven ashore and wrecked in the Bay of Biscay. She was on a voyage from Bayonne, Basses-Pyrénées to Toulon, Var.
Fanny	United Kingdom	The ship was driven ashore at Drogheda.
Grand Anacreon	France	The ship was wrecked near "Bordouan". All on board were rescued. She was on a voyage from Bordeaux, Gironde to Veracruz, Mexico.
Rafael	Spain	The ship was wrecked on Castle Island, Bermuda
Union	United Kingdom	The ship was driven ashore at Drogheda.

== 9 December ==
List of shipwrecks: 9 December 1830
Ship	State	Description
Canada	United Kingdom	The ship ran aground on the West Hoyle Bank, in Liverpool Bay. She was on a voyage from New York, United States to Liverpool, Lancashire.
Dickens	United Kingdom	The ship was driven ashore at Bayonne, Basses-Pyrénées. Her crew were rescued. She was on a voyage from Newfoundland, British North America to San Sebastián, Spain.
Hawk	United Kingdom	The ship was wrecked on the Barnard Sand, in the North Sea off Great Yarmouth, Norfolk. She was on a voyage from London to Leeds, Yorkshire.

== 10 December ==
List of shipwrecks: 10 December 1830
Ship	State	Description
Gaspee	(United Kingdom of Great Britain and Ireland) Jersey	The ship was wrecked in the Atlantic Ocean and was abandoned. Her crew were rescued by Duke of Marlborough (United Kingdom). The wreck was scuttled the next day by Commerce (United Kingdom). Gaspee was on a voyage from Jersey to a Mediterranean port.

== 11 December ==
List of shipwrecks: 11 December 1830
Ship	State	Description
Commerce	United Kingdom	The ship sprang a leak and was abandoned. She was on a voyage from Dartmouth, Devon to Gibraltar.
Micmac	United Kingdom	The ship capsized at the mouth of the Weser. Her crew survived. She was on a voyage from Königsberg, Prussia to Bremen.
Polyhymania	flag unknown	The ship was driven ashore near Trieste.

== 12 December ==
List of shipwrecks: 12 December 1830
Ship	State	Description
Betsey	United Kingdom	The ship was driven ashore and wrecked at Scarborough, Yorkshire Her crew were rescued by the Scarborough Lifeboat. She was on a voyage from Sunderland, County Durham to Whitby, Yorkshire.
Betsey and Peggy	United Kingdom	The ship was driven ashore near Seaton Carew, County Durham. Her crew were rescued. She was on a voyage from Hamburg to Newcastle upon Tyne, Northumberland
Cupid	United Kingdom	The sloop foundered in the North Sea between Robin Hoods Bay and Whitby.
Fowler	United Kingdom	The ship was driven ashore and wrecked at Whitby, Yorkshire. Her crew were rescued. She was on a voyage from Leith, Lothian to Whitby.
Gagara (Гагара)	Imperial Russian Navy	The transport ship was driven ashore and wrecked near Yevpatoria. Her crew were rescued. She was on a voyage from Yevpatoria to Sevastopol.
George	United Kingdom	The ship was driven ashore and wrecked at the mouth of the River Tees with the loss of all hands.
Harrington	United Kingdom	The brig was wrecked on the West Hoyle Sandbank, in Liverpool Bay with the loss of all hands.
John Kerr	United Kingdom	The ship was in collision with Joseph and Ann (United Kingdom in the English Channel off Beachy Head, Sussex and sank. Her crew were rescued by Joseph and Ann. John Kerr was on a voyage from London to Bristol, Gloucestershire.
Marchioness of Huntly	United Kingdom	The ship was driven ashore and wrecked near Seaton Carew with the loss of seven lives of her nine crew.
Napoleon	United States	The ship was driven ashore at Liverpool, lancashire, United Kingdom. She was on a voyage from New York to Liverpool.
Newcastle	United Kingdom	The ship was wrecked near Hartlepool, County Durham with the loss of all hands.
Northfield	United Kingdom	The ship was wrecked near Whitby. Her crew were rescued.
Peggie	United Kingdom	The sloop foundered in the North Sea off Robin Hoods Bay, Yorkshire with the loss of all four crew. She was on a voyage from Pittenweem, Fife to Newcastle upon Tyne, Northumberland.
Providence	United Kingdom	The ship was wrecked near Thisted, Denmark with the loss of all hands.
Richard	United Kingdom	The ship was run down and sunk in the Humber. Her crew were rescued. She was on a voyage from Newcastle upon Tyne to Great Yarmouth, Norfolk.
Sophia	France	The brig was abandoned in the North Sea. She subsequently came ashore at Schiermonnikoog, Friesland, Netherlands. Sophia was on a voyage from Libava, Courland Governorate to Boulogne, Pas-de-Calais.
Tenderton	United Kingdom	The ship was wrecked on the Herd Sand, in the North Sea off Hartlepool. Her crew were rescued.

== 13 December ==
List of shipwrecks: 13 December 1830
Ship	State	Description
Annie	United Kingdom	The ship was driven ashore on the coast of Lincolnshire. Her crew were rescued.
Boddington	United Kingdom	The ship was driven ashore and wrecked 5 nautical miles (9.3 km) south of Calcutta, India.
Fame	United Kingdom	The ship ran aground on a reef off Westport, County Mayo and was abandoned. She later floated off, presumed subsequently foundered. Fame was on a voyage from Saint John, New Brunswick, British North America to Galway. She came ashore on Hare Island, County Mayo on 17 December and was wrecked.
Fortitude	United Kingdom	The ship was driven ashore north of Sandhale, Lincolnshire. Her crew were rescued by the Spurn Lifeboat. She was on a voyage from Danzig, Prussia to Plymouth, Devon.
Four Brothers	United Kingdom	The fishing yawl was driven ashore and wrecked at Scarborough, Yorkshire. Her crew were rescued. She was on a voyage from Prestonpans, Lothian to Newcastle upon Tyne, Northumberland.
Johannes	Netherlands	The ship was driven ashore at Egmond aan Zee, North Holland. Her crew were rescued. She was on a voyage from Hull, Yorkshire, United Kingdom to Amsterdam, North Holland.
Juliana	United Kingdom	The ship was driven on to the Long Bank, in the Irish Sea off Wexford and sank. She was on a voyage from Bahia, Brazil to Liverpool, Lancashire.
Nicolay	(Russian Empire) Grand Duchy of Finland	The ship was driven ashore on Ameland, North Holland. Her crew were rescued. She was on a voyage from Wasa to Cádiz, Spain.
Tenterden	United Kingdom	The ship ran aground on the Herd Sand, in the North Sea off South Shields, County Durham. Her crew were rescued by the South Shields Lifeboat. Tenterden was refloated the next day.

== 14 December ==
List of shipwrecks: 14 December 1830
Ship	State	Description
Ulrick	Stettin	The ship was driven ashore between Thisted and Ringkøbing, Denmark. She was on a voyage from Nantes, Loire-Inférieure, France to Stettin.

== 15 December ==
List of shipwrecks: 15 December 1830
Ship	State	Description
Ann and Catherine	United Kingdom	The ship ran aground in the River Humber downstream of Howden, Yorkshire and sank.
Mary Ann	United Kingdom	The ship was driven ashore near Drigg, Cumberland.

== 16 December ==
List of shipwrecks: 16 December 1830
Ship	State	Description
Lerwick	United Kingdom	The ship was wrecked on the coast of Haiti. She was on a voyage from New York, United States to Jamaica.
Tasmania	United Kingdom	The ship was driven ashore at Odesa.

== 17 December ==
List of shipwrecks: 17 December 1830
Ship	State	Description
Iris	United Kingdom	The ship was wrecked at Blakeney, Norfolk. She was on a voyage from Danzig, Prussia to Jersey, Channel Islands.
Mary	United Kingdom	The ship was destroyed by fire at Coleraine, County Antrim.
Paragon	United Kingdom	The ship was wrecked at Demerara.

== 18 December ==
List of shipwrecks: 18 December 1830
Ship	State	Description
Brothers	United Kingdom	The ship was driven ashore at Leasowe, Cheshire. She was on a voyage from Liverpool, Lancashire to Mobile, Alabama, United States. Brothers had been refloated by 24 December.

== 19 December ==
List of shipwrecks: 19 December 1830
Ship	State	Description
Betsey	United Kingdom	The ship was driven ashore and wrecked at Woodspring Point, Somerset. She was on a voyage from Bridgwater, Somerset to Newport, Monmouthshire.
Dasher	United Kingdom	The steamship foundered in the Irish Sea off Portpatrick, Wigtownshire with the loss of one life. She was on a voyage from Donaghadee, County Down to Portpatrick.
Union		The ship was lost in the Elbe. Her crew were rescued. She was on a voyage from St. Thomas, Virgin Islands to Hamburg.

== 20 December ==
List of shipwrecks: 20 December 1830
Ship	State	Description
Active	United Kingdom	The ship was wrecked near Truro, Cornwall. Her crew were rescued. She was on a voyage from Kidwelly, Carmarthenshire to London.
Alexander and William	United Kingdom	The sloop was wrecked on the North Gaw Sandbank, in the North Sea off the mouth of the River Tees with the loss of all hands.
Argo	United Kingdom	The ship was wrecked at Swinemünde Prussia. She was on a voyage from "Laguira" to Swinemünde.
Catharine	United Kingdom	The ship sprang a leak and was abandoned in the Atlantic Ocean. Her crew were rescued by Henrietta (United Kingdom).
Elizabeth	United Kingdom	The ship was run into by another vessel and sank at Liverpool, Lancashire.
Ellen	United Kingdom	The brig was driven ashore on Lindisfarne, Northumberland and wrecked with the loss of four of her eleven crew. She was on a voyage from Liverpool to Newcastle upon Tyne, Northumberland.
Friends	United Kingdom	The smack was wrecked on Rathlin Island, County Antrim. Her crew were rescued. She was on a voyage from Campbeltown, Argyllshire to "Mollray".
Johanna	United Kingdom	The sloop was wrecked at Padstow, Cornwall. She was on a voyage from Baltimore, County Cork to Savannah, Georgia, United States.
Rotterdam	Netherlands	The ship was driven ashore at "Goree". All on board were rescued. She was on a voyage from London to Rotterdam, South Holland.
William and Mary	United Kingdom	The ship sank at Liverpool.

== 21 December ==
List of shipwrecks: 21 December 1830
Ship	State	Description
Inclination		The ship was wrecked off Borkum, Kingdom of Hanover. She was on a voyage from London, United Kingdom to Bremen.
Wayland	United States	The ship was abandoned off Ameland, Friesland, Netherlands. She was on a voyage from New York to Hamburg.

== 22 December ==
List of shipwrecks: 22 December 1830
Ship	State	Description
Bartley	United Kingdom	The ship was wrecked at Londonderry. Her crew were rescued.
Deborah	United Kingdom	The ship was driven ashore and wrecked at Cardiff, Glamorgan. She was on a voyage from Whitehaven, Cumberland to Cardiff.
Leighton	United Kingdom	The ship was driven ashore at Cardiff. She was on a voyage from Bangor to Gloucester.
Mary	United Kingdom	The ship was abandoned in the North Sea off Dimlington, Yorkshire. Her crew were rescued.
Nicholina and Christian	Norway	The ship was wrecked on Oyster Island, County Sligo, United Kingdom.
Thetis	United Kingdom	The ship foundered in the North Sea off Dunkirk, Nord, France with some loss of life. She was on a voyage from Cowes, Isle of Wight to Bremen.

== 23 December ==
List of shipwrecks: 23 December 1830
Ship	State	Description
Despatch	United Kingdom	The ship was driven ashore in Loch Ryan and wrecked. She was on a voyage from Porto, Portugal to Londonderry.
Hanna	Norway	The ship was driven ashore on Ameland, North Holland, Netherlands. She was on a voyage from Østerisør to Morlaix, Finistère, France.
Mary	United Kingdom	The ship foundered in the Irish Sea off Abergele, Caernarfonshire. She was on a voyage from Newport, Monmouthshire to Liverpool, Lancashire.

== 24 December ==
List of shipwrecks: 24 December 1830
Ship	State	Description
Antigone	Belgium	The ship ran aground and was wrecked on Walcheren, Zeeland, Netherlands with the loss of 25 lives. She was on a voyage from Batavia, Netherlands East Indies to Antwerp.
Gilbert	United Kingdom	The ship was wrecked at the mouth of the Arno. Her crew were rescued. She was on a voyage from Belfast to Genoa, Kingdom of Sardinia.
Henry	United Kingdom	The ship was wrecked near Winterton-on-Sea, Norfolk with the loss of three, her seven crew were rescued. She was on a voyage from Goole, Yorkshire to London.

== 25 December ==
List of shipwrecks: 25 December 1830
Ship	State	Description
Anna	United Kingdom	The ship was driven ashore near Mundesley, Norfolk. Her crew were rescued. She was on a voyage from Newcastle upon Tyne, Northumberland to Hamburg.
Neptune	France	The ship was wrecked near Adra, Spain.
Theodosia Matilda	United Kingdom	The ship was wrecked off Porto, Portugal.
Twee Gesusters	Belgium	The ship was driven ashore and wrecked 16 nautical miles (30 km) east of Ostend. Her crew were rescued.
William Rugg	United Kingdom	The ship was wrecked in the Gulf of Valona.

== 27 December ==
List of shipwrecks: 27 December 1830
Ship	State	Description
Glasgow	United Kingdom	The ship foundered in the Irish Sea off the coast of County Down.
Emanuel	Rostock	The ship was wrecked on the Niding Reef. She was on a voyage from Bergen, Norway to Rostock.
Johanna Dorothea	Greifswald	The ship was wrecked near Varberg, Sweden. Her crew were rescued. She was on a voyage from Dundee, Forfarshire, United Kingdom to Greifswald.
Perfect	United States	The ship was wrecked in the Biddy Islands. She was on a voyage from Boston, Massachusetts to Charleston, South Carolina.

== 28 December ==
List of shipwrecks: 28 December 1830
Ship	State	Description
Daniel	United Kingdom	The ship departed from Porto, Portugal for London. No further trace, presumed foundered with the loss of all hands.

== 29 December ==
List of shipwrecks: 29 December 1830
Ship	State	Description
Alert	United Kingdom	The schooner was driven ashore and severely damaged at Lisbon, Portugal.
Cayola	Netherlands	The ship was driven ashore crewless at Les Sables d'Olonne, Vendée, France.
Elizabeth	United Kingdom	The ship was driven ashore and damaged at Lisbon.
Emulation	(United Kingdom of Great Britain and Ireland) British North America	The ship was driven ashore and wrecked at Lisbon.
Guildford	United Kingdom	The ship departed from Singapore for London. No further trace, presumed foundered with the loss of all on board. She was subsequently wrecked in late April or early May 1831 off the southern tip of India with the loss of all on board.
Venus	United Kingdom	The ship was driven ashore and wrecked at Lisbon.
William & Jane	United Kingdom	The ship struck an underwater obstruction at Bridlington, Yorkshire and was consequently beached.

== 30 December ==
List of shipwrecks: 30 December 1830
Ship	State	Description
Venus	United Kingdom	The ship was driven ashore and wrecked at St. Ubes, Portugal.
Wanderer	United Kingdom	The ship was wrecked at Brindisi, Kingdom of the Two Sicilies. Her crew were rescued. She was on a voyage from Trieste to Zante, Greece.

== 31 December ==
List of shipwrecks: 31 December 1830
Ship	State	Description
Albion	United Kingdom	The ship was driven ashore at Ramsgate, Kent and severely damaged. She was on a voyage from London to Berbice, British Guiana.
Alexander	Hamburg	The brig was wrecked on the Goodwin Sands, Kent, United Kingdom with the loss of eleven of her twelve crew. One rescuer was also drowned. She was on a voyage from Hamburg to Havana, Cuba.
Orbit	United States	The ship was lost on the Long Sand, in the North Sea off the coast of Kent. She was on a voyage from Rotterdam, South Holland, Netherlands to Baltimore, Maryland.
William	United Kingdom	The ship was driven ashore and wrecked at Gorleston, Suffolk. She was on a voyage from Great Yarmouth, Norfolk to Newcastle upon Tyne, Northumberland.

== Unknown date ==
List of shipwrecks: Unknown date in December 1830
Ship	State	Description
Andrew Jackson	United States	The steamboat suffered a boiler explosion and sank at Savannah, Georgia with the loss of one of her six crew. survivors were rescued by the steamboats Charleston and Washington (both United States). Andrew Jackson was on a voyage from Charleston, South Carolina to Augusta, Georgia.
Baroness Keith	United Kingdom	The ship sprang a leak and was abandoned off Guernsey, Channel Islands. Her crew were rescued by St. Jacque (France) She was on a voyage from Tenerife, Spain to London.
Catharina	United Kingdom	The ship was wrecked on Götaland, Sweden before 4 December.
Countess of Harcourt	United Kingdom	The transport ship was wrecked on Corfu.
Dædalus	United Kingdom	The ship was driven ashore at "Peteudiac" in early December.
Emelia	France	The ship was wrecked near Quimper, Finistère.
Fame	United Kingdom	The ship was wrecked in Westport Bay. She was on a voyage from Saint John, New Brunswick, British North America to Galway.
Gustav Adolf	United Kingdom	The ship was driven ashore at "Intel".
Hebe	United Kingdom	The ship was wrecked on the west coast of Saint-Domingue. She was on a voyage from Liverpool, Lancashire to Port au Prince, Haiti.
Hope	United Kingdom	The ship was driven ashore and wrecked near Filey, Yorkshire.
Janet	United Kingdom	The sloop was wrecked on Coquet Island with the loss of all three crew. She was on a voyage from Dundee, Forfarshire to Newcastle upon Tyne, Northumberland.
Joanna	United Kingdom	The ship was wrecked ast Padstow, Cornwall. She was on a voyage from Baltimore, County Cork to Swansea, Glamorgan.
Koophandel	United Kingdom	The ship foundered in the North Sea off Ostend, West Flanders, Belgium. She was on a voyage from Batavia, Netherlands East Indies to a Dutch port.
Leeuw	flag unknown	The ship was lost off "Conquest" before 9 December. She was on a voyage from Portsmouth, Hampshire, United Kingdom to Nantes, Loire-Inférieure, France.
Opossum	(United Kingdom of Great Britain and Ireland) New South Wales	The cutter was wrecked on the east coast of Swan Island.
Royal Edward	United Kingdom	The ship foundered in the Gulf of Saint Lawrence. Her crew were rescued by Nelson (United Kingdom).
Twee Gebroeders	Belgium	The ship was driven ashore and wrecked near Ostend.
