= The Torrs =

Hills in Devon, England

Coordinates: 51.205°N 4.139°W

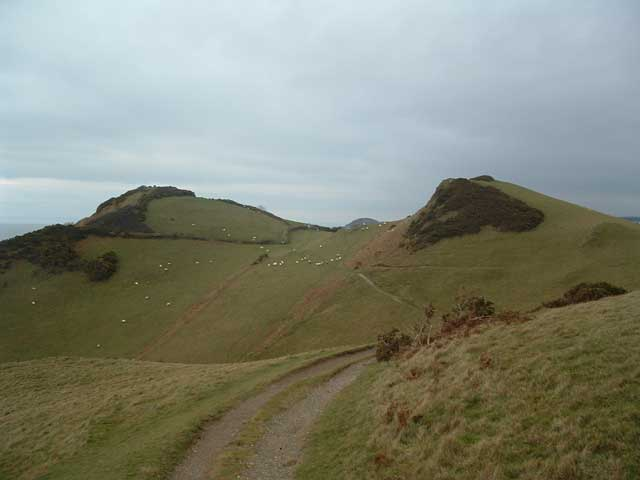
The Torrs

The Torrs are a Local Nature Reserve and one of the four main hills in the North Devon coastal town of Ilfracombe.

The Park originally was designed in the 1880s for Victorian recreation.

The South West Coast Path passes through the Torrs.
