= Warren Point, Wembury =

Promontory in South Devon, England

Coordinates: 50.312°N 4.055°W

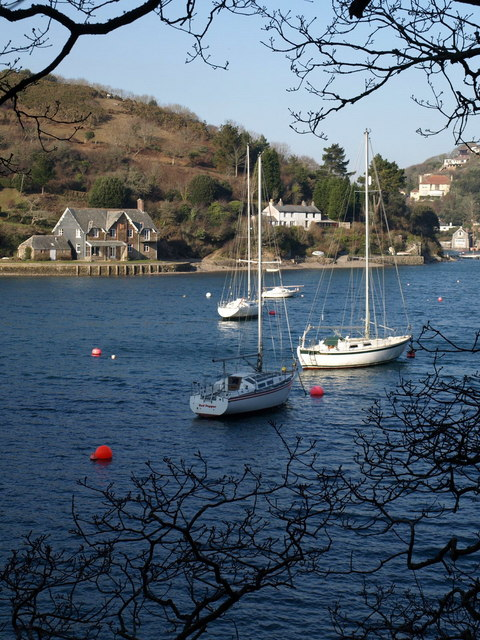
Warren cottages on Warren Point, from across the River Yealm

Warren Point is a promontory in South Devon, located southeast of Plymouth. The Warren Point foot ferry links Wembury, on the western side of the River Yealm, to both Newton Ferrers and Noss Mayo on the eastern side of the river. This crossing is popular with hikers walking along the South West Coast Path.
