= South West Coast Path =

Long-distance footpath in England

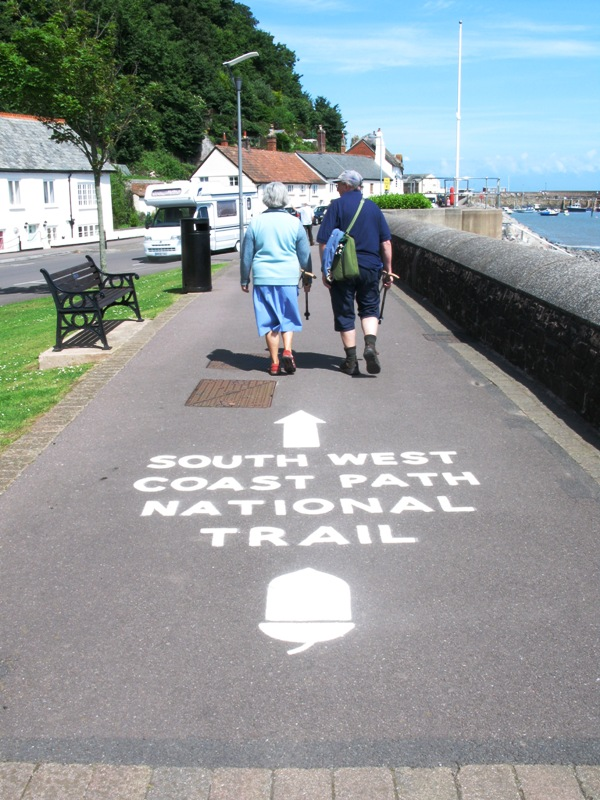
- The starting point at Minehead
- Length: 1,014 km (630 mi)
- Location: England: Somerset, Devon, Cornwall & Dorset
- Designation: UK National Trail
- Trailheads: Minehead: 51.211°N 3.474°W; Poole: 50.680°N 1.950°W
- Use: Hiking
- Elevation change: total climbed is 114,931 feet (35,031 m)
- Highest point: Great Hangman near Combe Martin, 318 m (1,043 ft)
- Lowest point: sea level
- Season: all year
- Sights: Coastal scenery, much of it Heritage Coast; World Heritage Sites: Jurassic Coast and Cornwall and West Devon Mining Landscape
- Hazards: Cliff paths, river crossings (ferries with limited availability), closure of Lulworth Ranges

The South West Coast Path is England's second-longest waymarked long-distance footpath, after the King Charles III England Coast Path, and is designated as a National Trail. It stretches for 630 miles (1,014 km), running from Minehead in Somerset, along the coasts of Devon and Cornwall, to Poole Harbour in Dorset. Because it rises and falls at every river mouth, it is also one of the more challenging trails. The total height climbed has been calculated as 114,931 ft (35,031 m), almost four times the height of Mount Everest. It has been voted "Britain's Best Walking Route" twice in a row by readers of Walk, the Ramblers' magazine, and regularly features in lists of the world's best walks.

The final section of the path was designated as a National Trail in 1978. Many of the landscapes which the South West Coast Path crosses have special status, either as a national park or one of the heritage coasts. The path passes through two World Heritage Sites: the Dorset and East Devon Coast, known as the Jurassic Coast, was designated in 2001, and the Cornwall and West Devon Mining Landscape in 2007.

In the 1990s it was thought that the path brought £150 million into the area each year, but new research in 2003 indicated that it generated around £300 million a year in total, which could support more than 7,500 jobs. This research also recorded that 27.6% of visitors to the region came because of the path, and they spent £136 million in a year. Local people took 23 million walks on the path and spent a further £116 million, and other visitors contributed the remainder. A further study in 2005 estimated this figure to have risen to around £300 million. Following investment through the Rural Development Programme for England, more detailed research was undertaken in 2012, and this found the annual spend by walkers to have risen to £439 million which sustains 9771 full-time equivalent jobs.

== History of the path ==
The path originated as a route for the Coastguard to walk along patrolling for smugglers. They needed to be able to look down into every bay and cove; as a result, the path closely hugs the coast, providing excellent views, but rarely the most direct path between two points. The South West Coast Path is no longer used by the Coastguard, but it has been transformed from a practical defence system into a resource for recreational walkers. The path is covered by England's right-of-way laws, as amended by the Countryside and Rights of Way Act 2000, which keep historic footpaths open to the public even when they pass through private property. Sections of the path are maintained by the National Trust, which owns parts of the coast.

The path is a designated National Trail, largely funded by Natural England. It was created in stages, with its final section, Somerset and North Devon, opening in 1978. It is maintained by a dedicated South West Coast Path Team.

The South West Coast Path Association, a registered charity, exists to support the interests of users of the path. The Association was formed in 1973; since then, it has campaigned for improvements to the path and undertakes considerable fundraising to help care for and improve the path. Its services include accommodation guides and completion certificates.

== Route description ==
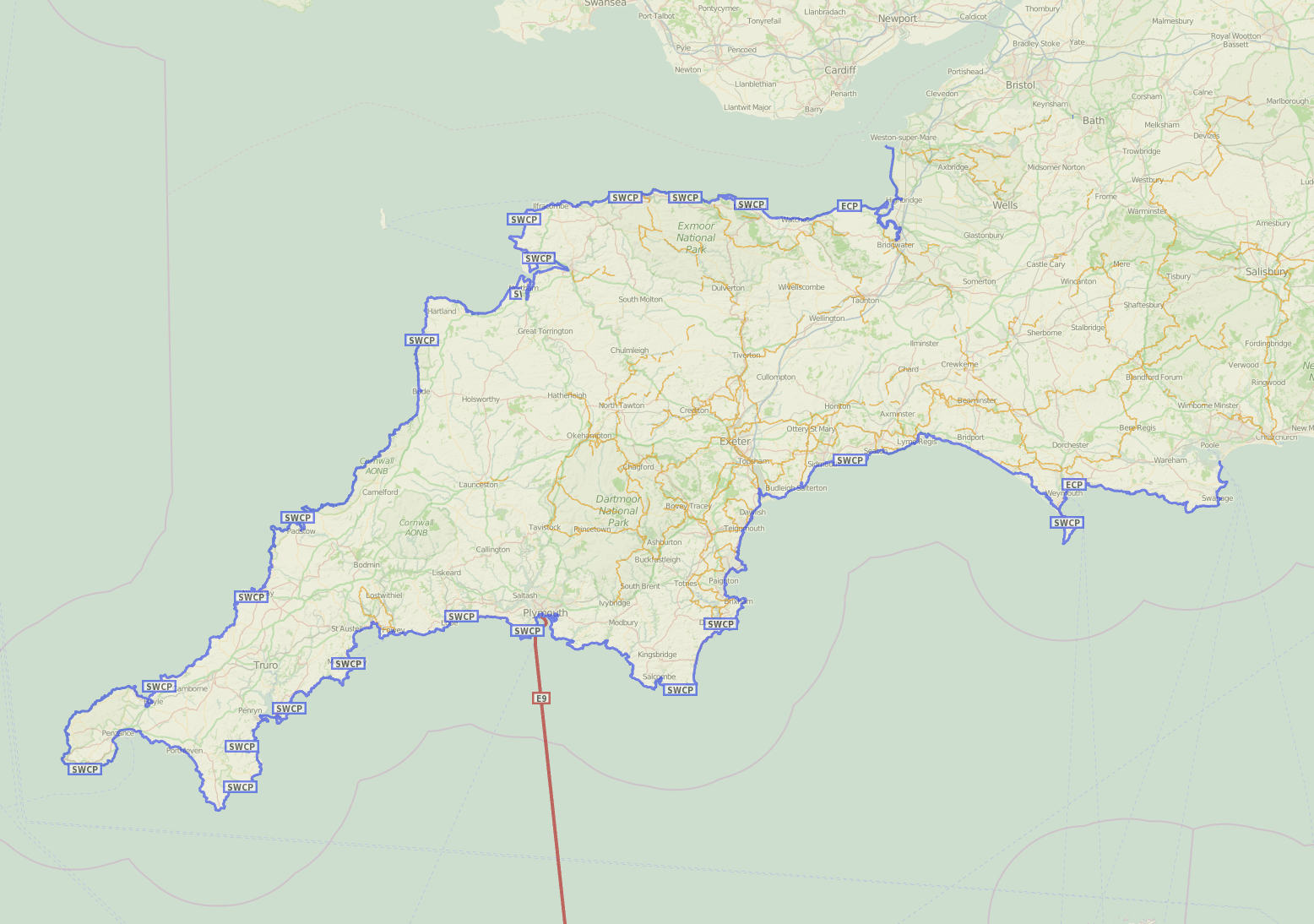
Map of the South West Coast Path

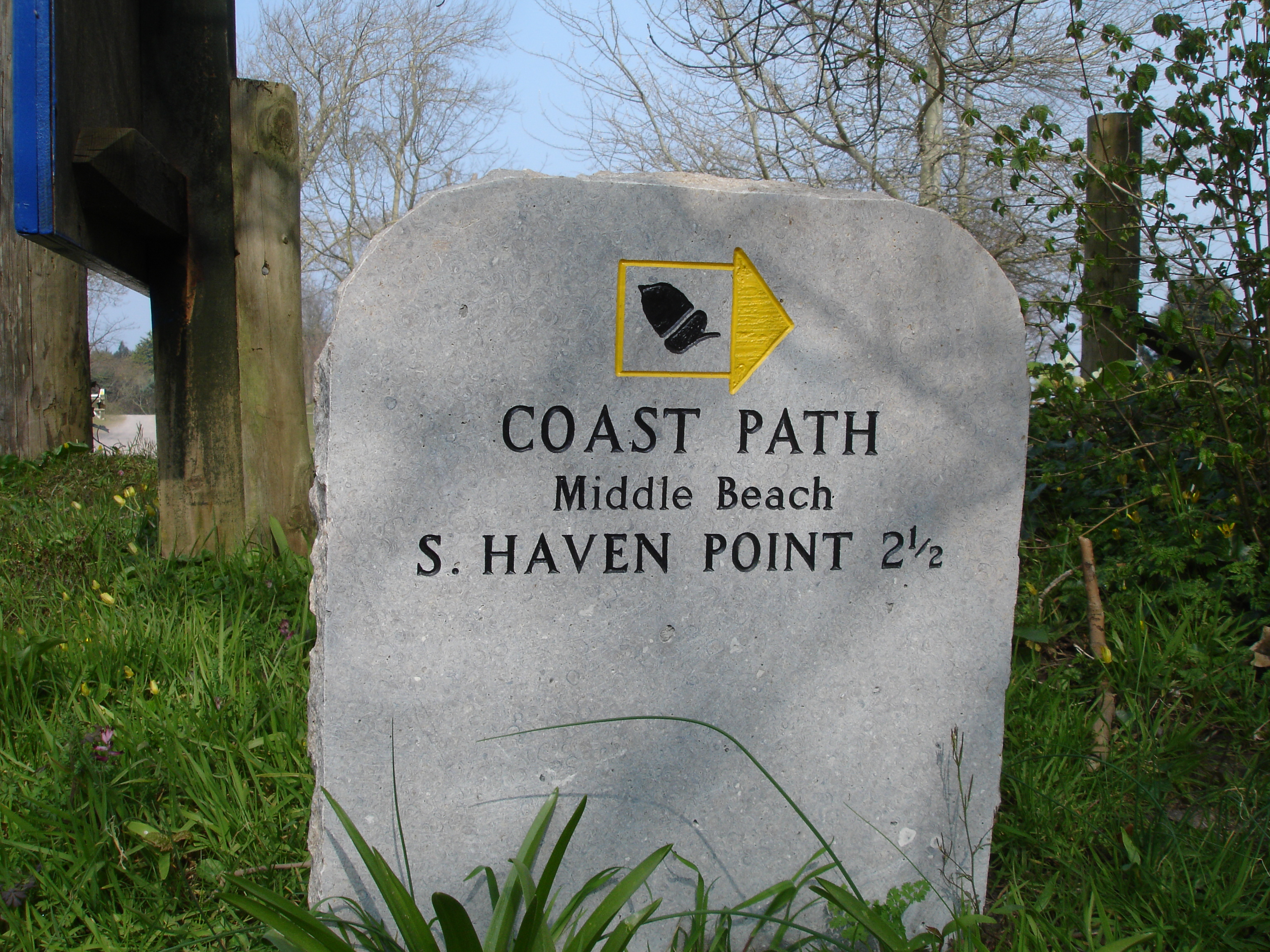
South West Coast Path, stone sign near Studland

The route is described here anticlockwise, from Minehead to Poole. The distance and total ascent between any two points, in either direction, can be obtained from the South West Coast Path website. A survey carried out in 1999 and 2000 found that at that time the path had 2,473 signposts or waymarks, and included 302 bridges, 921 stiles, and 26,719 steps. In practice, any such calculation is soon out of date because of path diversions due to landslips or access changes.

Walked as a single hike, the path may take between 30 and 60 days to complete, but most walkers tend to break it up into shorter segments completed over several years. A team of six Royal Marines, taking turns in pairs to run two-hour sections, completed the path in six days in 2004. In 2012 Mal Law ran the entire path in 16 days, 9 hours and 57 minutes. New records for completing the path were set on 11 May 2013, when Mark Townsend and Julie Gardener completed the trail in 14 days, 14 hours and 44 minutes and 23 April 2015, when Patrick Devine-Wright completed the trail in 14 days, 8 hours and 2 minutes. This record, however, was quickly broken by Mark Berry, who ran it in 11 days, 8 hours and 15 minutes. On 24 May 2016, Damian Hall set a new fastest known time of 10 days, 15 hours and 18 minutes and Kristian Morgan ran the route 10 days, 12 hours and 6 minutes in September 2020. This was beaten by Dave Phillips with 10 days, 8 hours and 24 minutes in May 2022 and then by Dan Lawson who completed the route in 9 days 13 hours and 40 minutes in July 2025.

=== Somerset ===
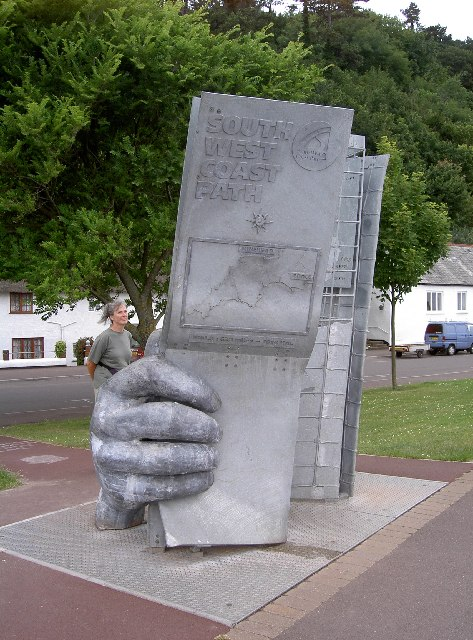
Sculpture at the start of the path in Minehead

The South West Coast Path starts from the western side of Minehead, in Somerset, at a marker erected in 2001 and partly paid for by the South West Coast Path Association. The path follows the waterfront past the harbour to Culver Cliff before climbing up on a zigzag path through woodland. Entering the Exmoor National Park, it cuts inland past North Hill, Selworthy Beacon and Bossington Hill before regaining the cliff top at Hurlestone Point. After passing through Bossington, it follows the beach to Porlock Weir and connects with the Coleridge Way.

The scenery of rocky headlands, ravines, waterfalls and towering cliffs gained the Exmoor coast recognition as a Heritage Coast in 1991. The Exmoor Coastal Heaths have been recognised as a Site of Special Scientific Interest (SSSI) due to the diversity of species present. The path passes the smallest parish church in England, Culbone Church, in Culbone. The path crosses the county boundary into Devon, a few hundred yards north of the National Park Centre at County Gate.

=== North Devon ===
The next big headland is Foreland Point, after which the path comes to Lynmouth, with the Lynton and Lynmouth Cliff Railway linking it with Lynton on the hill above. At Lynmouth, the path intersects with the Two Moors Way. The river here suffered a catastrophic flood in the 1950s. Beyond Lynton, the path passes through the Valley of Rocks, known for its herd of goats, then Duty Point and Lee Bay, then Crock Point and Woody Bay. After Highveer Rocks, the path crosses the small River Heddon, then skirts Trentishoe Down and Holdstone Down and climbs Great Hangman. At 1,043 feet (318 m), this is the highest point on the path. With a cliff face of 800 feet (244 m), it is described as the highest cliff on mainland Britain. The path now leaves the Exmoor National Park and enters the village of Combe Martin, which claims to have the longest village street in England (two miles (3.2 km)).

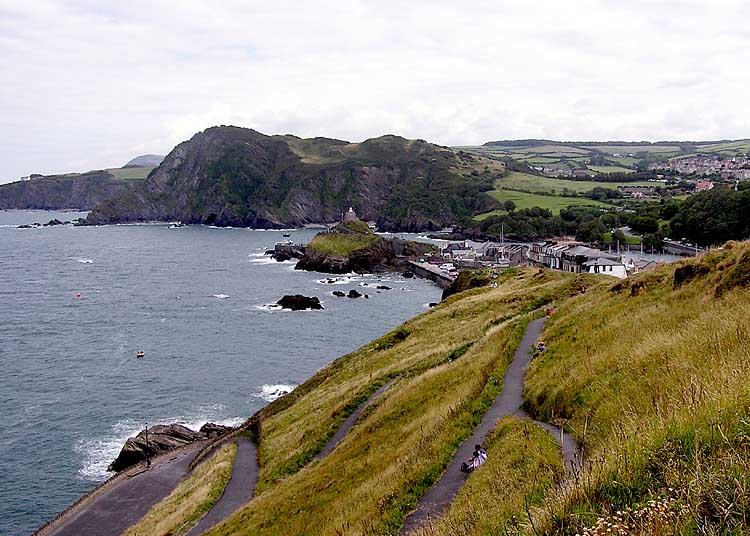
The South West Coast Path passes along the cliffs (seen in the distance) at Ilfracombe, North Devon. The highest point in this view is Hillsborough (447 feet, 136 metres). Part of Ilfracombe is seen on the right.

After rounding Widmouth Head, the path passes 'The Coastguard Cottages' in Hele Bay and enters the seaside resort of Ilfracombe, with its small harbour, surrounded by cliffs. A seasonal foot passenger ferry service runs from the harbour to Lundy Island. The Balmoral, the Waverley and pleasure boats ply to Porthcawl, near Swansea. From Ilfracombe to Bideford, the Tarka Trail coincides with the South West Coast Path.

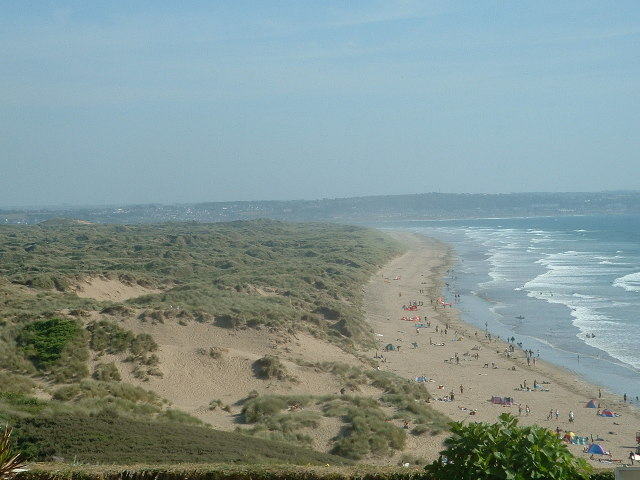
Saunton Sands

The path leaves Ilfracombe through The Torrs and follows the cliff top past several small bays, including Lee Bay, before passing Bull Point and the Bull Point Lighthouse, into Rackham Bay. It then rounds Morte Point, passing the nearby village of Mortehoe, before turning south to enter the long sandy Morte Bay, which includes Woolacombe and Putsborough. Baggy Point divides Morte Bay from Croyde Bay, and the surfing mecca of Croyde, and then the much larger Barnstaple or Bideford Bay, which forms part of the North Devon Coast Area of Outstanding Natural Beauty. The wide expanse of Saunton Sands, which takes its name from Saunton, merges into the Braunton Burrows Site of Special Scientific Interest, the largest sand dune system (psammosere) in England and a UNESCO Biosphere Reserve. It is particularly important ecologically because it includes the complete successional range of dune plant communities, with over 400 vascular plant species. The short turf communities are very rich in lichens and herbs, and the dune slacks are also rich. The many rare plants and animals include 14 with UK Biodiversity Action Plans.

From Braunton Burrows the South West Coast Path turns inland, following the Braunton Canal to Braunton, and then along the north bank of the River Taw, following part of the route of the old Ilfracombe Branch Line, past the perimeter of the Royal Marines Base Chivenor towards Barnstaple where the new Barnstaple Western Bypass now forms the closest bridge over the Taw to the sea. After crossing medieval Barnstaple Long Bridge, the path then turns west, following the disused Bideford & Instow Railway line along the southern bank of the Taw past Fremington Quay and the Fremington Quay Cliffs SSSI to Instow at the joint estuary of the Rivers Taw and Torridge and the Taw-Torridge Estuary (SSSI). The ferry which used to operate at Instow ceased on the retirement of the ferryman in 2007, but since 2013 a revived ferry again runs in summer. The path goes upstream to cross the river by the 13th-century Long Bridge at Bideford, which is the site of the Bideford Railway Heritage Centre and terminus of the North Devon Railway.

The path continues north beside the Torridge Estuary, in places following the route of the Bideford, Westward Ho! and Appledore Railway, past Northam to Appledore and around the promontory past the Shell middens and a submerged forest, that dates from the Mesolithic period, off the pebble ridge to Westward Ho! (this is the only placename in the UK which includes an exclamation mark). The path then follows the coast around Clovelly Bay where several small villages including Abbotsham lie inland, because of the cliffs. The path passes the site of the Iron Age Hill fort at Peppercombe Castle and the village of Bucks Mills. Clovelly itself is a historic village with a small natural harbour. The path continues past the site of the Iron Age Hill fort at Windbury Head to Hartland Point and Hartland Quay. Hartland Point features a lighthouse and radar tower, and marks the western limit (on the English side) of the Bristol Channel with the Atlantic Ocean to the west. There is a winter helicopter service from Hartland Point to Lundy, which is visible from many points along the path between Welcombe and the Cornish border.

=== North Cornwall ===
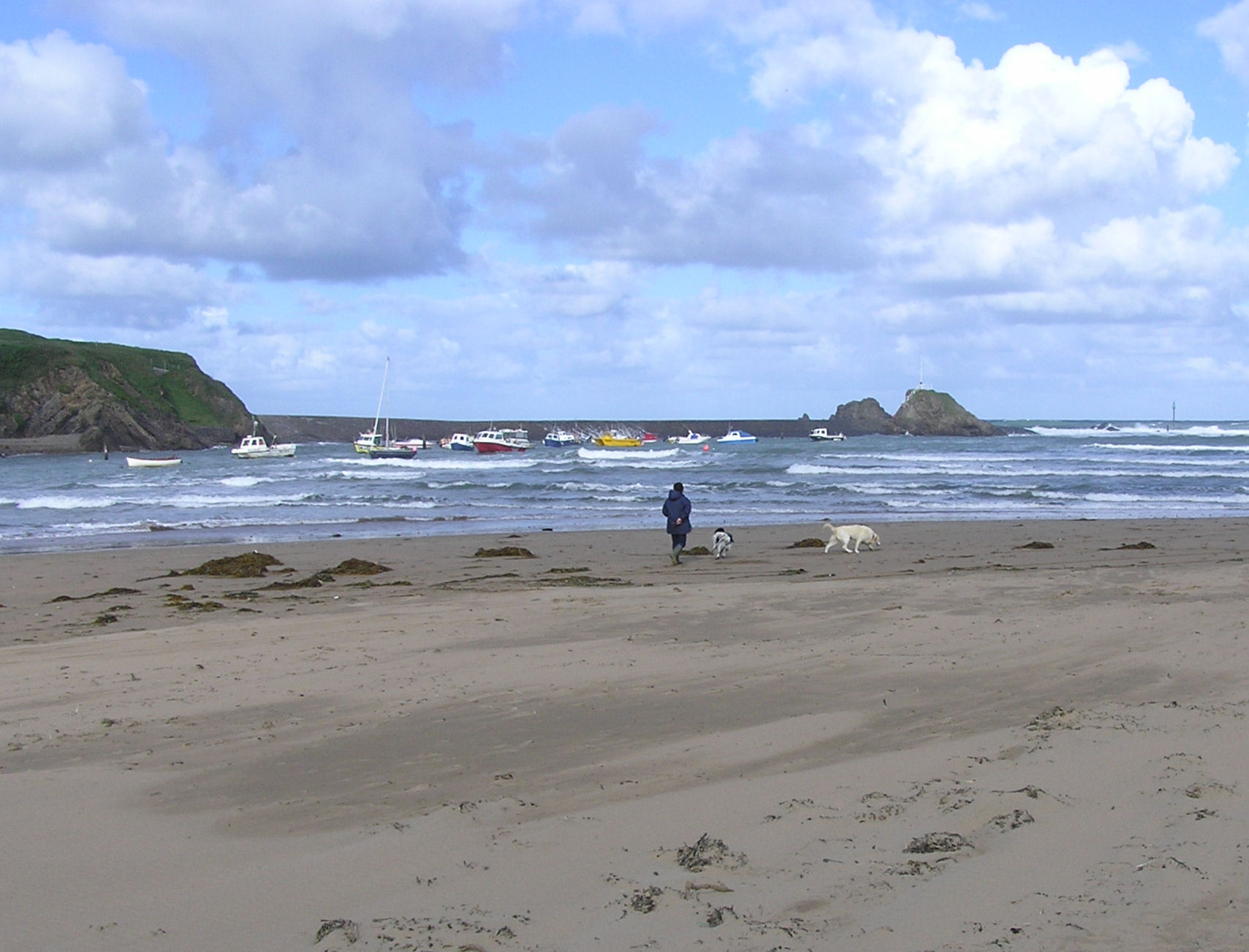
The Haven, the Atlantic Ocean and the beach at Bude

The path crosses into Cornwall at Marsland Mouth and continues south-westwards along this rocky coast, past Morwenstow then Higher and Lower Sharpnose Points. Beyond Sandy Mouth, the walking becomes easier through Bude, a surfing resort, and along Widemouth Bay. Returning to the cliffs, the path continues past the spectacular folds at Millook, then to Crackington Haven, past Cambeak and further south (over "High Cliff", Southern Britain's highest sheer-drop cliff at 735 feet (224 m)), and from there to Boscastle, the scene of flooding in 2004.

Tintagel and its castle are associated with the conception of the legendary King Arthur and a 15th-century house that was later used as a post office. The path continues to Trebarwith Strand, Tregardock, then to Port Gaverne, Port Isaac, and Port Quin, three small harbours. Overlooking Port Quin is Doyden Castle, a 19th-century folly.

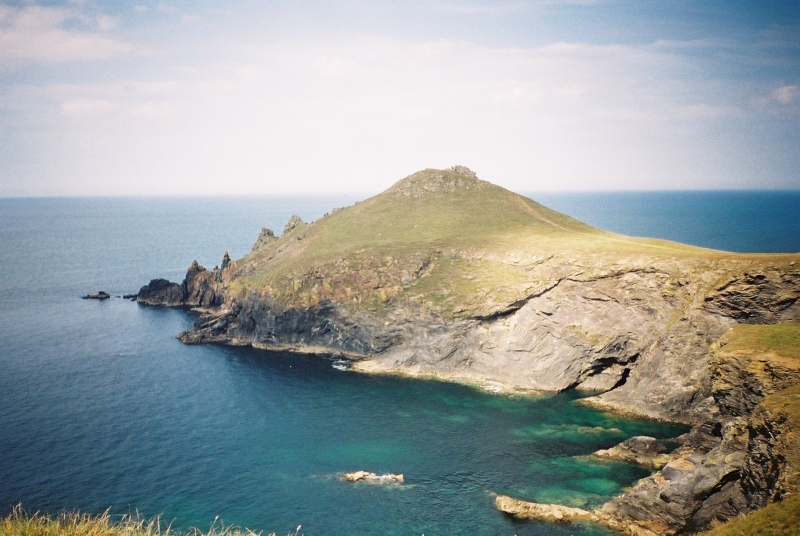
The Rumps

The scenery is now less wild, the cliffs less high. The Rumps, a dolerite intrusion, has Iron Age defences across its narrow neck but the path heads straight past to Pentire Point then swings south-eastwards again into Polzeath. The estuary of the River Camel forces a detour away from the sea to Rock and the Black Tor Ferry that takes walkers into Padstow.

From Stepper Point the path again runs along low sea cliffs to Trevone and Harlyn Bay then around Trevose Head. From here—weather permitting—the coast can be seen as far as Hartland in Devon to beyond St Ives in the west. The path runs southwards through Constantine Bay to Porthcothan then passes around Park Head to reach Mawgan Porth.

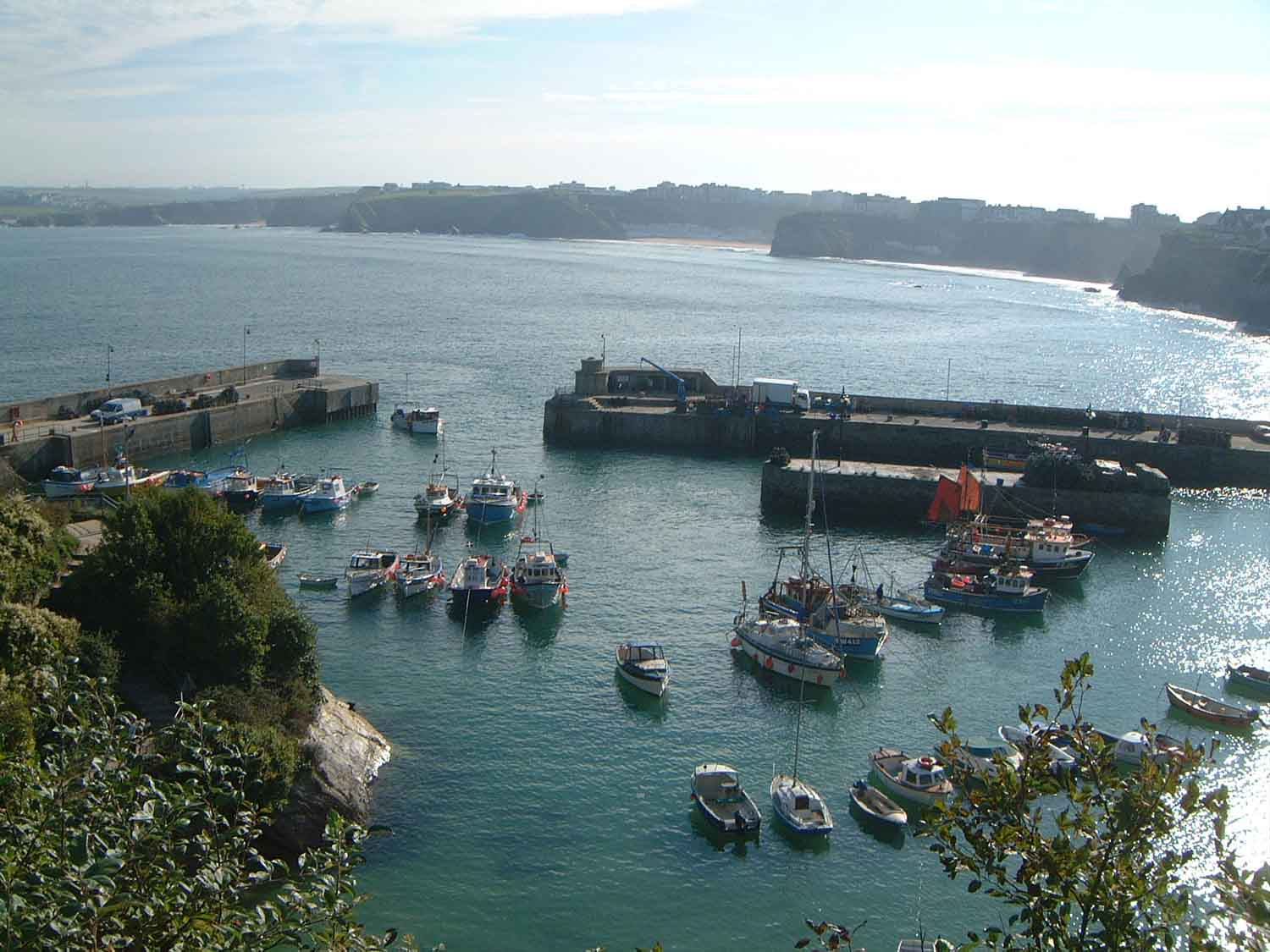
An easterly view over Newquay Harbour with some of the surfing beaches in the background

The long, sandy Watergate Bay leads to St Columb Porth and Newquay. A rail link with through trains to London and the North of England on summer weekends has helped the town prosper as a seaside resort which is visited by both surfers and clubbers. On the far side of the town, beyond Fistral Beach, lies the River Gannel. There is a seasonal ferry to Crantock, plus three tidal footbridges along the river which are passable at various states of the tide, otherwise at the highest tide it may be necessary to detour inland to use the road bridge.

The path now skirts Pentire Point West and then Kelsey Head to reach Holywell Bay, another surfing beach. After passing round Penhale and crossing Penhale Sands the path enters Perranporth, then climbs out the other side back onto a stretch of cliffs past Cligga Head to the village of St Agnes. Past St Agnes Head, a breeding ground for seabirds, lie the ruins of Tywarnhayle Mine and a descent past the picturesque remains of Wheal Coates tin mine (National Trust) down to a small beach at Chapel Porth. Above this cove on the south side are the less extensive ruins of Great Wheal Charlotte mine, consisting of one wall of a pump engine house within an extensive debris field. The path then descends to a popular sandy cove with pub and car park near Porthtowan village.

After passing Nancekuke firing ranges, the path drops into Portreath, once a busy port serving inland tin mines around Redruth. Beyond lies Carvannel Downs with Samphire Island just off the coast, and then the Reskajeage Downs better known locally as North Cliffs. Beyond the cove at Hell's Mouth, the path runs northwards to pass around Navax Point and Godrevy Point, offshore from which lies Godrevy Island with its lighthouse.

=== West Cornwall ===
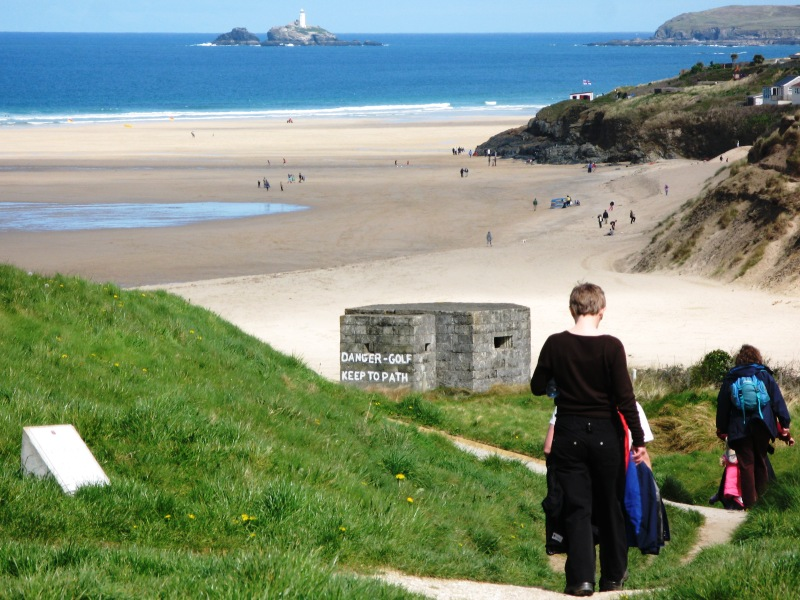
The SWCP near Lelant looking towards Hayle Towans and Godrevy island

Turning into the wide sweep of St Ives Bay, where many walkers drop down onto the sands at low tide, the path follows the line of the sand dunes or Towans as they are known here. This area was used for explosives manufacture for many years, the sand being ideal for absorbing any accidental explosions. The Towans are interrupted by two rivers, the small Red River at the north end, and the larger River Hayle and its estuary towards the south. Although narrow, the estuary is tidal and fast flowing due to the large expanse of mud flats and docks that lie behind the Towans, so the path turns away from St Ives Bay to go round via Hayle. Hayle estuary is a RSPB reserve. The water is crossed using a road bridge beside the historic broad-gauge railway swing-bridge and then the path follows the route of the former Hayle Railway into Foundry Square, the town centre, and then the A30 road to Griggs Quay where quieter roads bring the Path around to the west side of the tidal mud flats. Views of the birdlife can be had from Carnsew Pool at Hayle and from the area around Lelant Saltings railway station, although the official path is slightly inland on the A3074 road through Lelant village, regaining the coast by crossing golf links to reach the last of the Towans above Porth Kidney Sands.

Rising back onto low cliffs, the path rounds Carrack Gladden and enters Carbis Bay, it then follows alongside the St Ives Bay railway line into St Ives; a bustling town favoured by artists since the 19th century, which is home to the Tate St Ives art gallery and the Barbara Hepworth Museum. The path passes the east-facing Porthminster Beach and goes around "The Island", a headland, to the north-facing Porthmeor Beach.

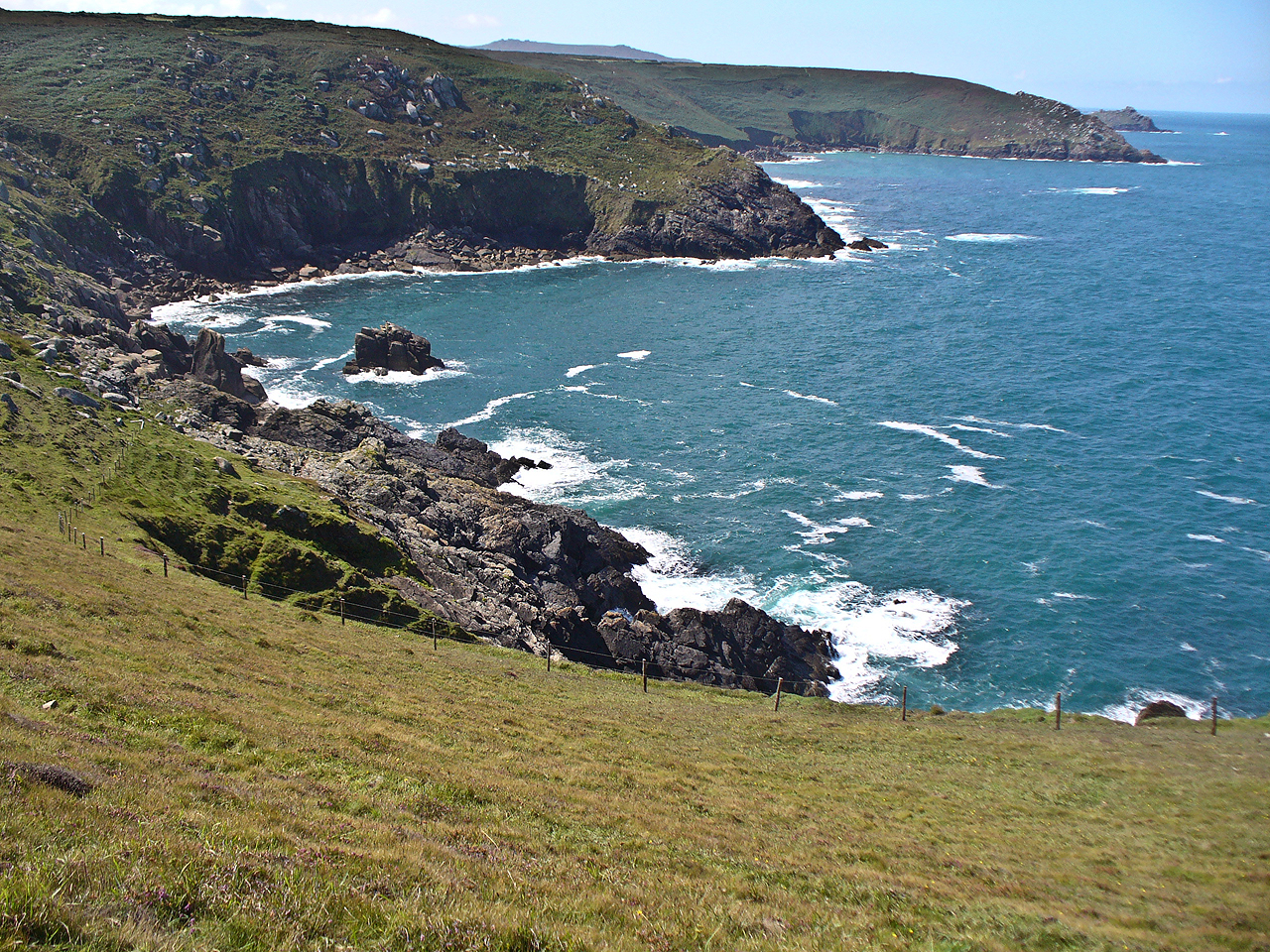
From Mussel Point over Wicca Pool and Porthzennor Cove to Zennor Head and Gurnard's Head beyond

The coast now shows the open and ancient landscape of the Penwith district along a series of wild headlands such as Clodgy Point, Hor Point, Pen Enys Point, and Carn Naun Point. The Carracks lie just offshore, locally known as Seal Island (and seals can often be seen close to the shore opposite here), then there lies Zennor Head and Gurnard's Head as the Path leads into Morvah, although the village proper lies inland. Portheras Cove is a relief from the many small rocky bays along this coast but the cliffs then continue beyond the iconic, disused Crowns Mine at Botallack.

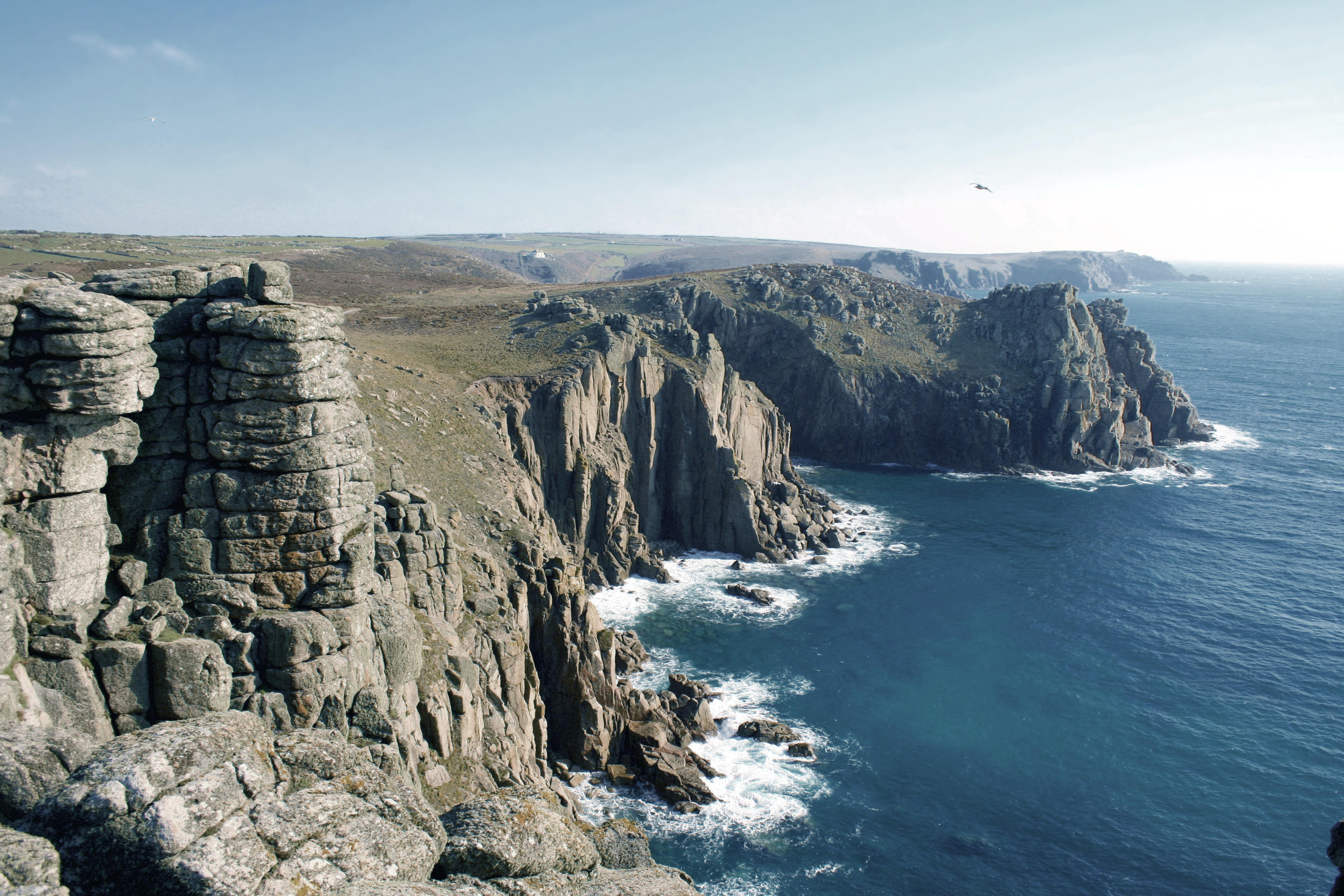
Near Land's End, the most westerly point in mainland England

From Cape Cornwall at St Just, the Path heads southwards to sandy Whitesand Bay and the village of Sennen. At the end of the sands the path turns westwards one last time to reach Land's End. This is the most westerly point of the English mainland.

After passing Land's End the path continues further south past Pordenack Point and Nanjizal, also known as Mill Bay, before turning fully eastward at Gwennap Head. Beyond the tiny village of Porthgwarra lies St Levan. The next bay lies below Porthcurno. It is overlooked by the open-air Minack Theatre and is where the Eastern Cable Company's cable came ashore, the first telegraph link with India. Climbing out of the bay the path passes the precarious Logan Rock.

The next village is Penberth, then a series of bays are separated by the headlands of Merthen Point, Boscawen Point, and Tater Du with its lighthouse built in 1965. Lamorna Cove is a favourite with artists such as S. J. "Lamorna" Birch, who lived there in a small cottage. Then, after rounding Carn Du, the path turns northwards towards Mousehole and Penlee Point. This section of the path follows a road into Newlyn, but a diversion via Paul allows walkers to follow a quieter inland path. Newlyn has a busy fishing harbour and is again favoured by artists, known as the Newlyn School; it merges into Penzance and the path now follows the promenade through the town, passing Penzance railway station and continuing past the railway engine shed along the shore of Mount's Bay with its views of St Michael's Mount. This is an island at high tide but can be reached from Marazion by a causeway at low tide.

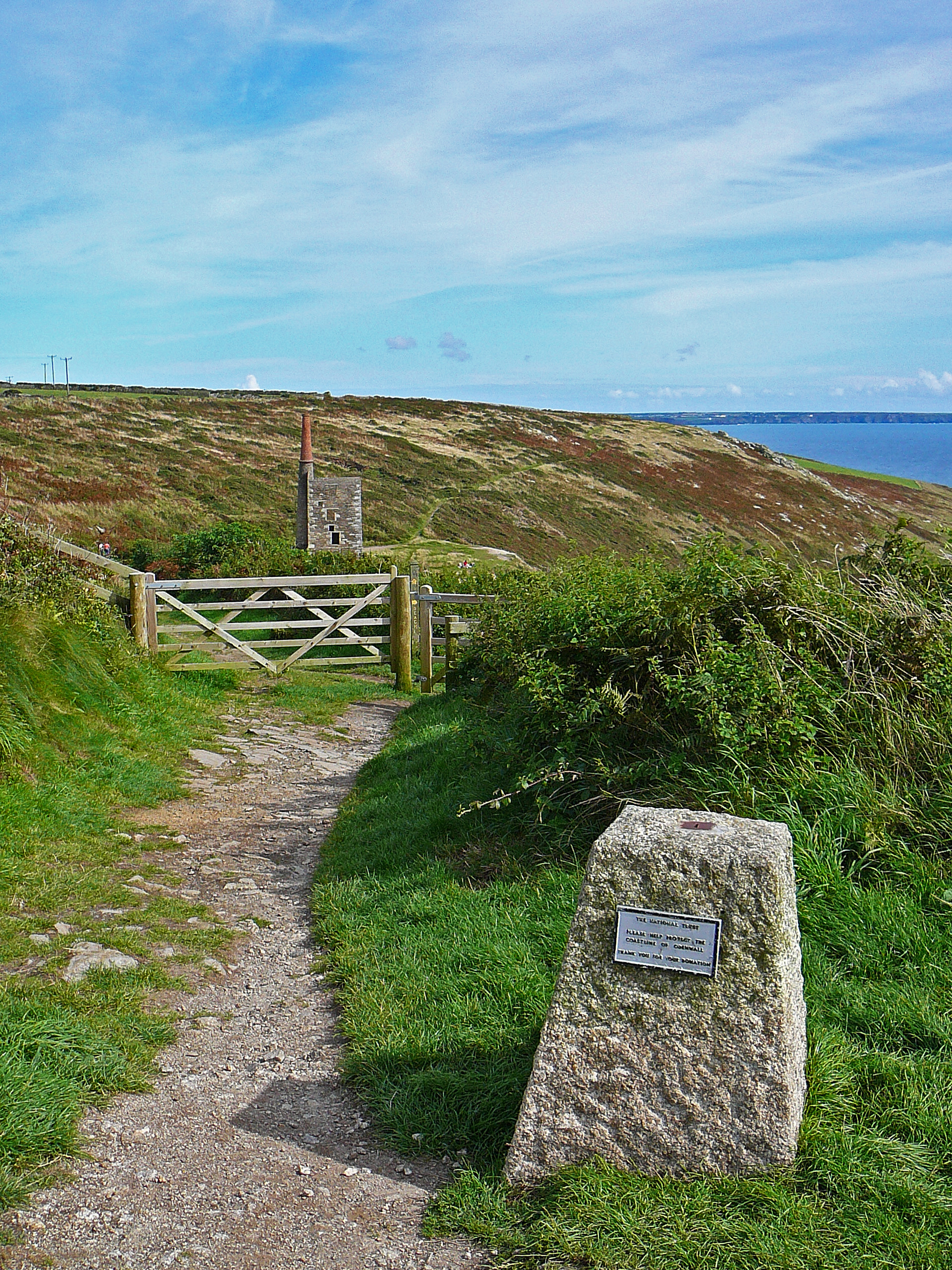
Wheal Prosper

The path now turns south again, passing the village of Perranuthnoe (or Perran) and Perran Sands, then skirting inland across the neck of Cudden Point to Prussia Cove and Bessy's Cove. A larger sandy beach is Praa Sands after which the path climbs up onto a series of cliff tops such as Trewavas Head. This area shows many signs of Cornwall's mining history with abandoned engine houses such as Wheal Prosper and Wheal Trewavas close to the path.

After passing through Porthleven the path crosses the shingle bank of Loe Bar with the freshwater Loe Pool behind. At Gunwalloe more cliffs appear, leading to Poldhu Cove overlooked by the radio station on Poldhu Point, then Porth Mellin on Mullion Cove with Mullion Island offshore. Rounding Predannack Head, Vellan Head, and Rill Head (where the Spanish Armada was first sighted on 29 July 1588), the path leads to Kynance Cove and Lizard Point, the lighthouse of which has been visible for some distance. Lizard Point is the most southerly point of the British mainland.

=== South Cornwall ===
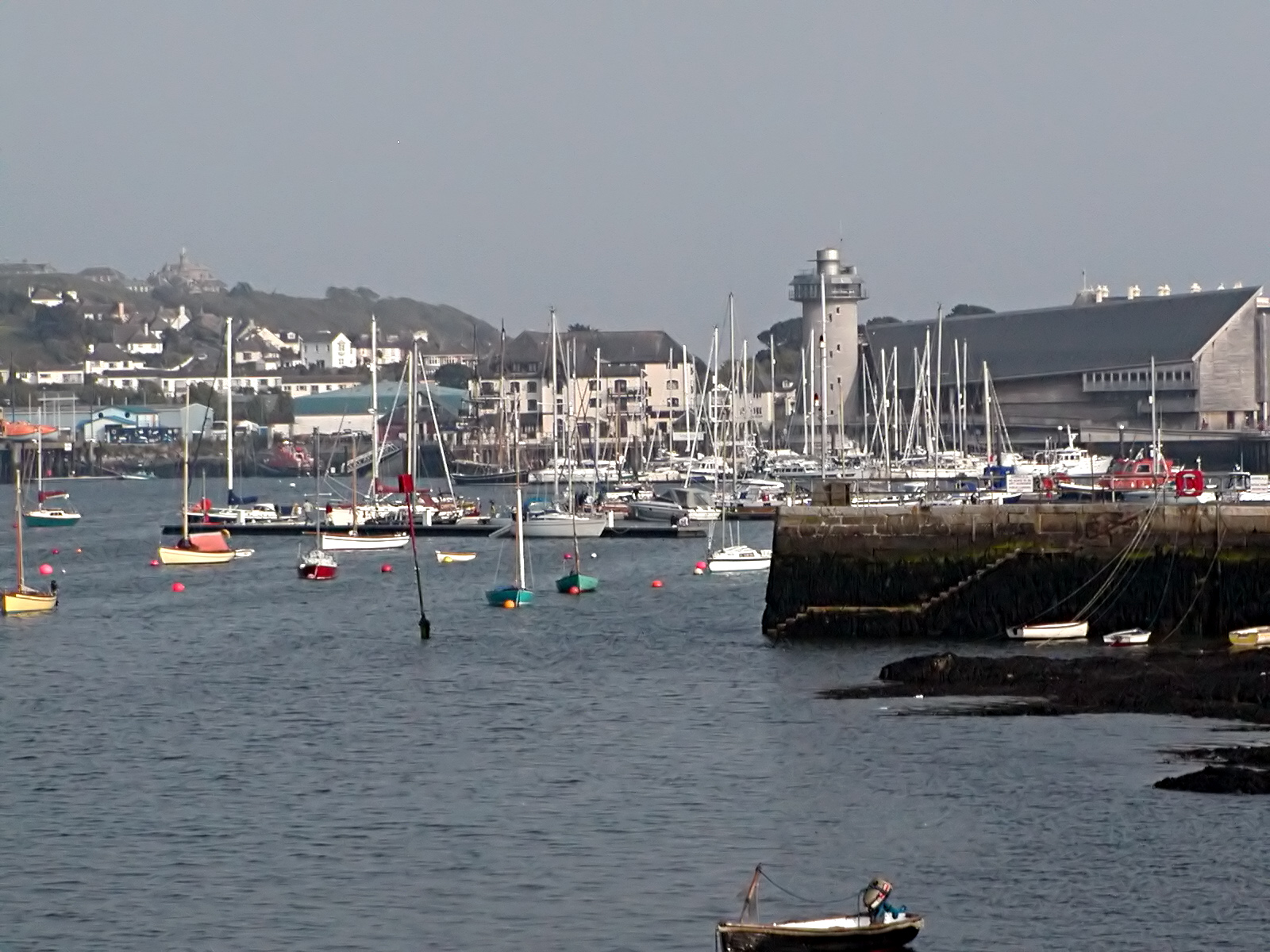
Falmouth Harbour, National Maritime Museum Cornwall and Pendennis Castle

After passing The Lizard the path turns northwards, continuing past Housel Bay and a building used by Guglielmo Marconi for radio experiments, then Bass Point with its Coastguard Station. The Lizard lifeboat station is a sheltered position in Kilcobben Cove. Passing through Cadgwith and across Kennack Sands, the path heads towards Black Head then into Coverack. Once around Lowland Point, The Manacles lie a mile offshore, a reef that has wrecked many ships. The path passes through Porthoustock and Porthallow (the mid-point of the path), then around Nare Point lies Gillan Creek. This can be crossed at very low tide, but most walkers follow the lanes round the head of the creek to reach Dennis Head at the mouth of the Helford River. To cross this wider river means following it inland to Helford where there is a ferry across to Helford Passage on the north bank. Some people take a short cut from Gillan Creek to Helford by a path through Manaccan.

After following the river back through Durgan to the open waters beyond Toll Point, the path skirts Falmouth Bay along Maenporth, Swanpool and Gyllyngvase beaches before passing around the headland beneath Pendennis Castle to enter bustling Falmouth. The castle was built, along with its twin at St Mawes, to protect the deep water of Carrick Roads from attack. This natural haven is what made Falmouth such an important harbour, it being the last good shelter for ships heading westwards towards the Atlantic Ocean.

The path crosses the harbour on the St Mawes Ferry and the Place Ferry (see Fal River Links) and then passes St Anthony Head and Zone Point and northwards past the village of Portscatho and around Gerrans Bay. Beyond Nare Head is Portloe in Veryan Bay. The next big headland is Dodman Point after which the coast path resumes its northwards course through Gorran Haven and the fishing harbour at Mevagissey to Pentewan where the once busy dock has silted up with sand. The path then climbs up around Black Head to reach Porthpean and then Charlestown. This was the first harbour to serve the china clay industry around St Austell and has featured in several films as it is home to a heritage fleet of sailing ships.

After passing Carlyon Bay the path comes to the much busier china-clay exporting port of Par, where it goes inland of the dock site. After passing through the village the path regains the coast at Par Sands and links with the Saints' Way, a coast-to-coast path across Cornwall, at Polmear. It then follows the cliff tops through Polkerris and around Gribbin Head. From here to Polperro is designated as a heritage coast.

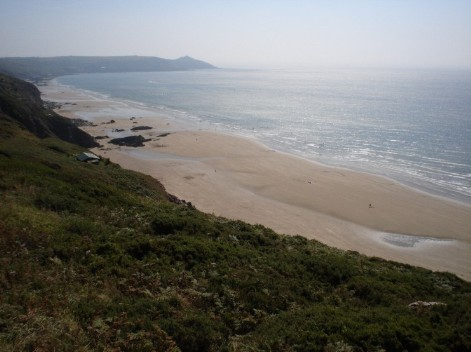
Withnoe (Main) Beach portion of Whitsand Bay

The path now passes Polridmouth (pronounced 'Pridmouth') and Readymoney Cove to enter Fowey ('Foy'), another busy harbour but this time the deep water quays are situated up river above the town. The River Fowey is crossed on the Polruan ferry, beyond which are some steep cliffs with extensive views. Beyond Lantic Bay lies Pencarrow Head then the larger Lantivet Bay with further cliffs and small coves leading to Polperro, a fishing village which bans cars during the summer.

Beyond Polperro lies Talland Bay and Portnadler Bay, with the bird reserve of Looe Island (also known as St George's island) off shore. The path now enters Looe, passing through Hannafore, West Looe then, after crossing the River Looe on a seven-span bridge. The path continues up onto the cliff then heads towards Millendreath then along more cliffs, running past a 60-ft sevenfold labyrinth carved into the turf of the hillside to Seaton, Downderry, and Portwrinkle.

The long beach of Whitsand Bay has a fast-rising tide and is a military firing range so the path runs inland behind Tregantle Fort to reach Freathy and Rame Head. Beyond this lies Penlee Point and then the path turns northwards into Plymouth Sound, skirting Cawsand Bay and Mount Edgcumbe Country Park to reach the ferry at Cremyll. Beyond here lies the Hamoaze, the combined estuary of the Tamar and other rivers.

=== South Devon ===
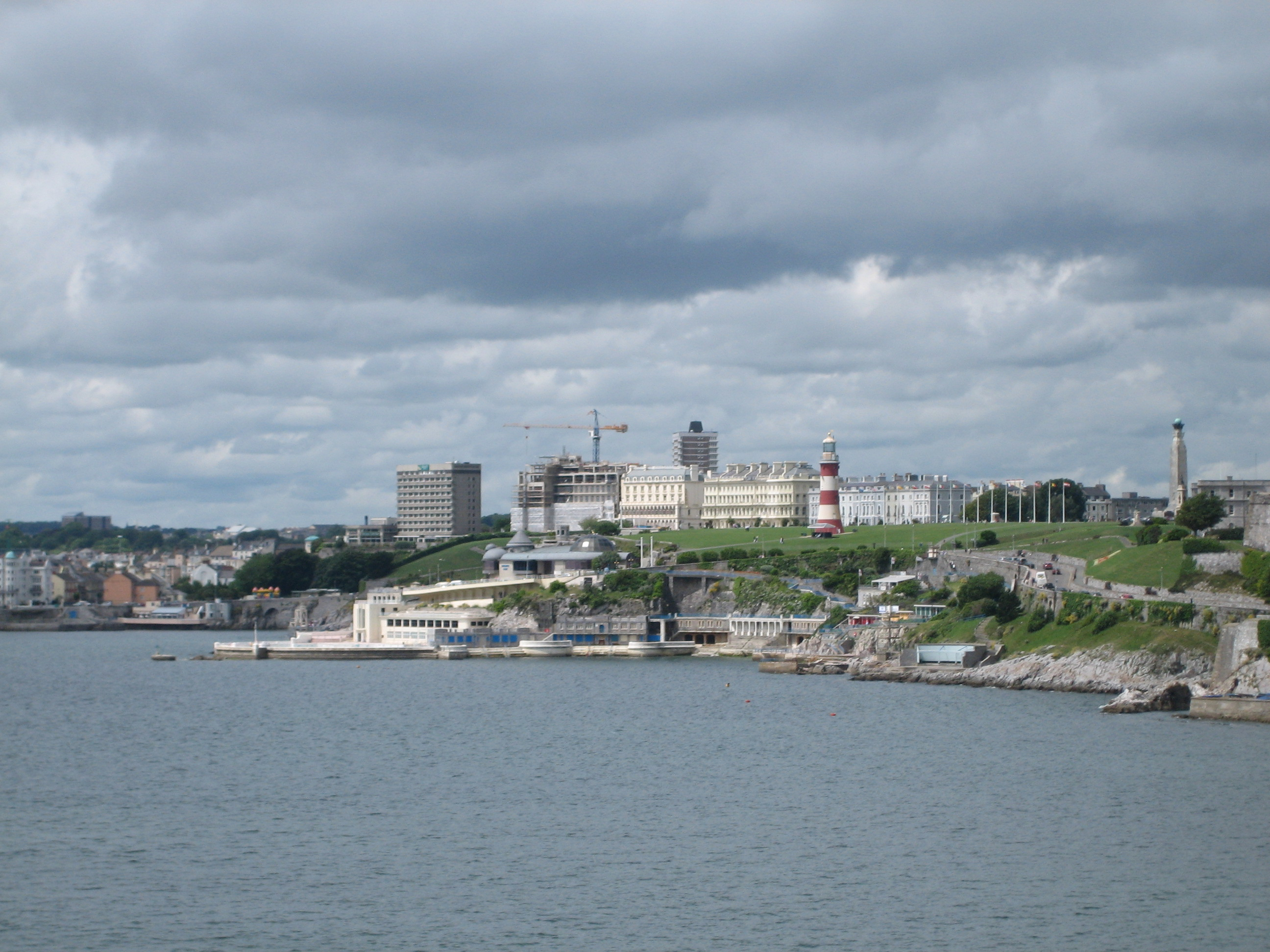
Plymouth Hoe from Mount Batten

The Cremyll Ferry lands in Devon at Stonehouse, one of the Three Towns that make up the modern city of Plymouth. The path follows roads past Stonehouse Barracks and Millbay Docks to Plymouth Hoe with its views across Plymouth Sound. It then crosses Sutton Harbour by the Mayflower Steps then skirts the hill of Cattedown to cross the River Plym by the Laira Bridge to Plymstock. Passing round the edge of the tidal Hooe Lake, the path regains the countryside above Jennycliff Bay, part of the Plymouth Sound, Shores and Cliffs Site of Special Scientific Interest, and follows the cliffs past Bovisand to Wembury, Wembury Marine Centre.

From Wembury the path travels east into the South Hams district to the Warren Point Ferry, across the River Yealm, near Newton Ferrers. The River Erme near Kingston must be forded at Erme Mouth within one hour of low tide. The path then goes past Hillsea Point Rock. The view to the southwest is then over Bigbury Bay past Burgh Island and Hope Cove to the promontory known as Bolt Tail. The next 6 miles (10 km) of cliff top paths from Bolberry Down past Bolt Head (within Bolt Head to Bolt Tail SSSI) and the tidal ria of Kingsbridge Estuary to Prawle Point, belong to the National Trust. The estuary is crossed using the Salcombe Ferry, from Salcombe to East Portlemouth, close to Salcombe Castle and within the South Devon Area of Outstanding Natural Beauty (AONB). The path passes through the Prawle Point and Start Point Site of Special Scientific Interest which is recognised as being an important site for solitary bees and wasps, the rare cuckoo bee Nomada sexfasciata, and the Cirl bunting.

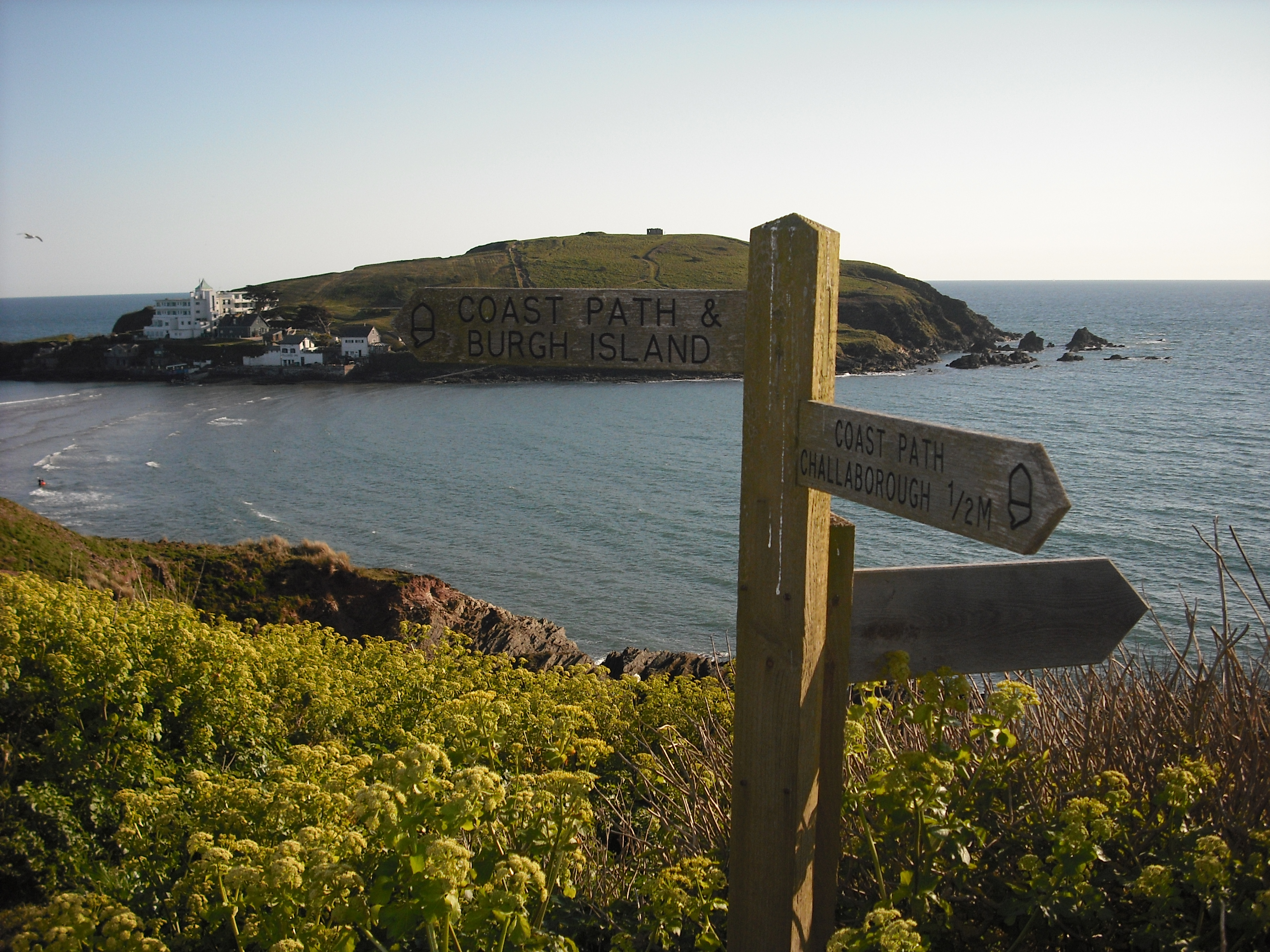
Direction sign at Bigbury-on-Sea with Burgh Island in the background

The path then continues around Lannacombe Bay to Start Point and its Lighthouse and then through Start Bay along a 3-mile (5 km) shingle causeway between Slapton Sands and the Slapton Ley freshwater lake and nature reserve before entering the estuary of the River Dart and historic port of Dartmouth. From Dartmouth, the route uses either the Lower Ferry or Passenger Ferry to cross the river to Kingswear.

Kingswear is the terminus of the Dartmouth Steam Railway which follows the River Dart, but the coast path climbs out of the village in the opposite direction to reach Torbay, known as "The English Riviera". It passes the historic harbour of Brixham and the seaside towns of Goodrington, Paignton, Torquay and Babbacombe. The coast path then passes along the wooded cliffs above Labrador Bay to reach Shaldon and the River Teign.

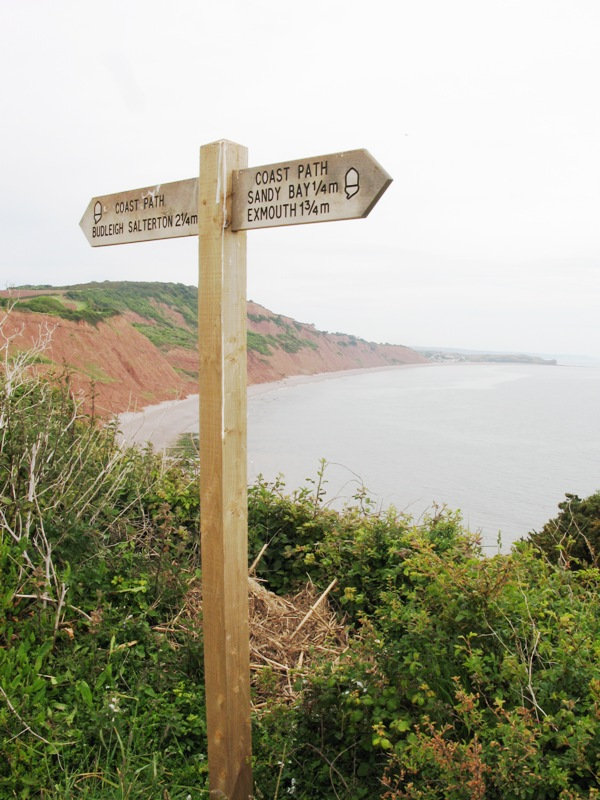
On the Jurassic Coast between Exmouth and Budleigh Salterton

Crossing the river by ferry or the long Shaldon Bridge brings walkers to Teignmouth, beyond which the coast path follows the South Devon Railway sea wall to Hole Head where the Parson and Clerk rocks look out to sea. Passing beneath the railway, the path climbs up to the main road, which it follows for a few yards before turning back towards the cliff top (in stormy weather the sea wall is too dangerous and this road must be followed most of the way from Teignmouth). Entering Dawlish along a now by-passed toll road, the coast path descends back to the level of the railway which it follows to Dawlish Warren, although a slightly more landward route is necessary at high tide.

Dawlish Warren is a sand spit and nature reserve that lies at the mouth of the River Exe. The route now turns away from the coast and follows the Exe estuary past Cockwood to Starcross where the seasonal Exmouth to Starcross Ferry crosses to Exmouth. The Exe Valley Way continues beyond Starcross towards Exeter, but when the ferry is not running it is possible to catch a train from either Dawlish Warren or Starcross railway stations to Exmouth railway station.

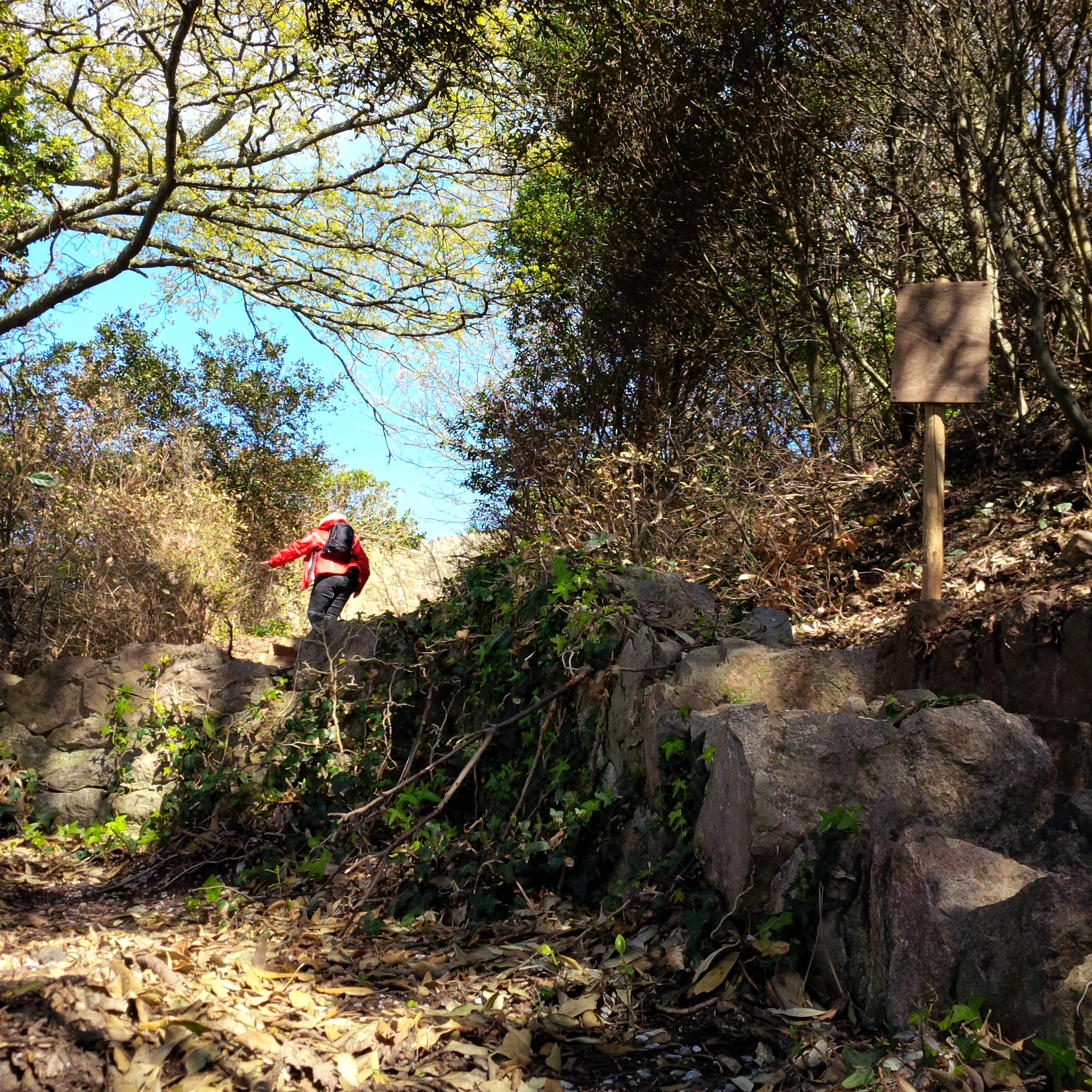
South West Coast Path in Torquay

On the eastern side of Exmouth, the coast path climbs up onto the High Land of Orcombe. This is the start of the Jurassic Coast, a World Heritage Site. The next town is Budleigh Salterton, beyond which lies the River Otter. The path then skirts Chiselbury Bay and Ladram Bay towards Sidmouth which sits at the mouth of the River Sid. Access to the beach is via a wooden staircase known as Jacob's ladder. Sidmouth is surrounded by the East Devon AONB. Erosion remains a serious concern east of the mouth of the River Sid. The cliffs have been heavily eroded, threatening cliff top homes and the footpath, which passes along the tops of the cliff, around Lyme Bay, avoiding Hooken Undercliff towards Branscombe. The path then follows Seaton Bay past Beer, with Beer Quarry Caves a man-made cave complex, resulting from the quarrying of Beer stone and Seaton before going through the Axmouth to Lyme Regis Undercliff SSSI and NNR and crossing the border into Dorset shortly before reaching Lyme Regis.

=== Dorset ===
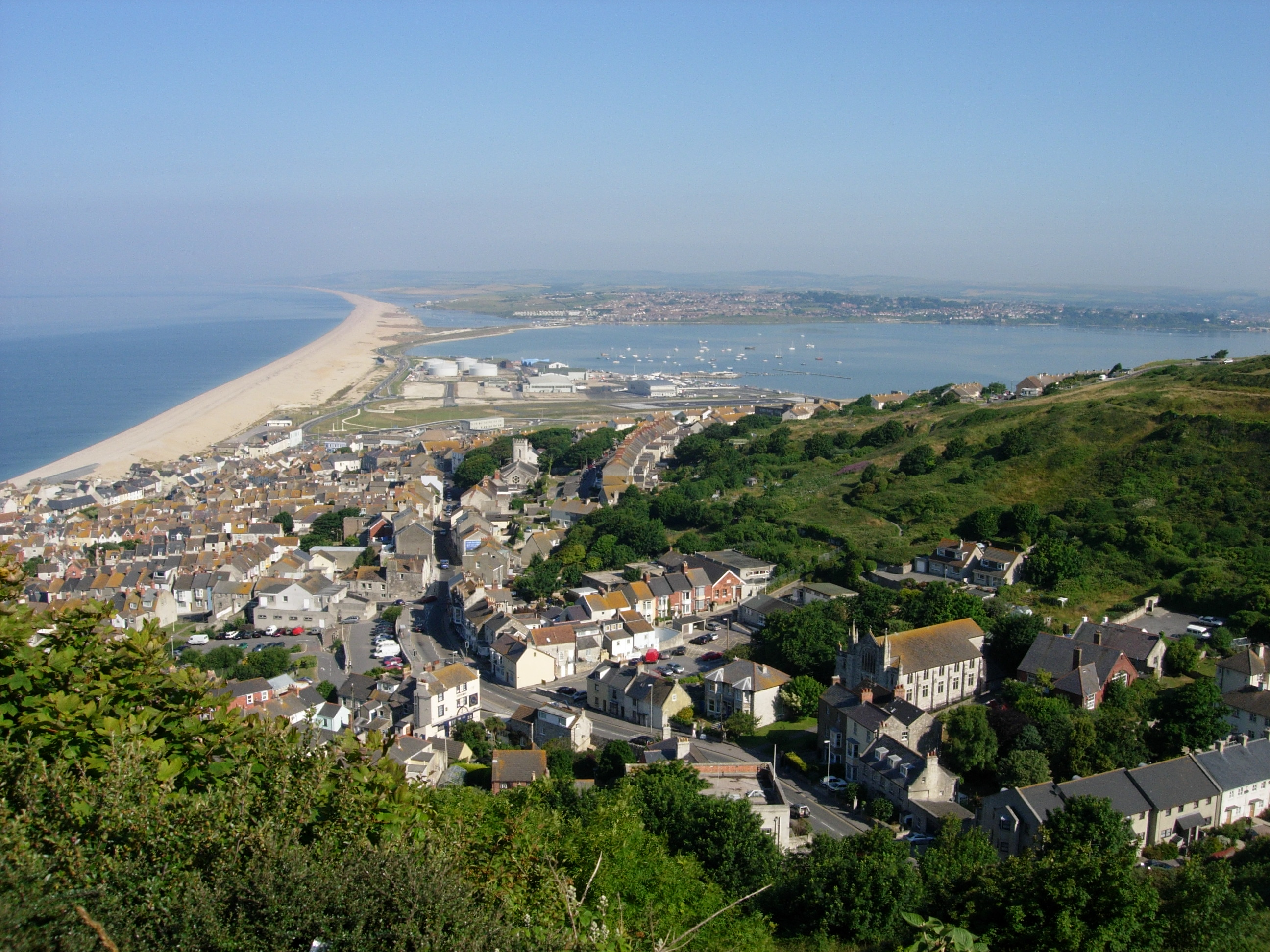
Chesil Beach and Fortuneswell, looking north from the Isle of Portland

Across the Dorset border, the Coast Path runs through the town of Lyme Regis where the Cobb breakwater was seen in the film The French Lieutenant's Woman and features on the film's poster. Further east, where it shares its route with the Monarch's Way, the path passes through Charmouth, up Golden Cap (the highest point on the south coast), and on through West Bay (near Bridport), to Burton Bradstock at the start of Chesil Beach, an 18-mile-long (29 km) tombolo. At Abbotsbury, the path leaves Chesil beach to follow the shores of the Fleet lagoon, until it reaches the terminus of Chesil beach next to the villages of Fortuneswell and Chiswell on the Isle of Portland. The path circumnavigates the Isle of Portland, passing the lighthouses at Portland Bill and the Weymouth and Portland National Sailing Academy in Chiswell, and returns across Chesil beach to Wyke Regis (encompassing the Rodwell Trail) and along the shores of Portland Harbour to the Nothe Fort in the resort of Weymouth.

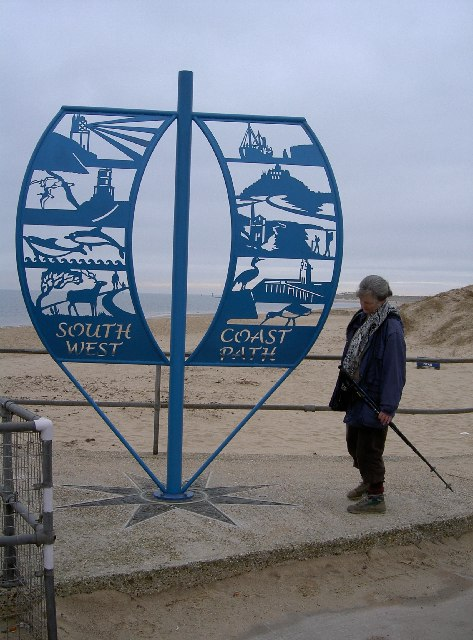
Sculpture at South Haven Point, Studland, at the anticlockwise end of the path

In Weymouth the coast path runs along Weymouth Harbour and the Wey Estuary up to Radipole Lake, through the town centre to the Esplanade on the shore of Weymouth Bay, and on to Ringstead Bay, with White Nothe at its eastern end, near the village of Osmington Mills. There is an alternative route around Weymouth and Portland along the South Dorset Downs, which reduces the footpath distance by 19.25 miles (31 km). Just the loop around the Isle of Portland can be omitted, reducing the journey by 13.2 miles (21.2 km).

The coast path then heads towards the Isle of Purbeck, via Bat's Head, Swyre Head, Durdle Door—a natural arch which has been described as "one of Dorset's most recognisable features"—and Lulworth Cove, "the most visited geological locality in Britain". Further east is the deserted village of Tyneham, beside Worbarrow Bay, and Kimmeridge, next to Kimmeridge Bay, with its rocky shore and wave cut platform. Between Lulworth Cove and Kimmeridge the path passes through the Lulworth Ranges, which are not always open to the public. When the ranges are in use a 12-mile (19 km) road detour is needed.

The coast path then reaches St Alban's Head, just to the south of the village of Worth Matravers. Between St Alban's Head and the resort of Swanage is Durlston Country Park nature reserve; from Worth Matravers to Swanage the coast path follows the route of the Priest's Way. North of Swanage is the chalk Ballard Down, the eastern tip of which has been eroded to form Old Harry Rocks – a series of stacks, arches and caves jutting into the sea between Swanage Bay and Studland Bay. This headland marks the end of the Jurassic Coast World Heritage Site. Behind Studland beach, an extensive system of sand dunes have formed a psammosere, stretching for miles across the Studland peninsula. The peninsula forms one shore of Poole Harbour, one of the largest natural harbours in the world. Part of Studland beach is the National Trust's only official naturist beach. The South West Coast Path ends at South Haven Point, where there is a commemorative marker. The Sandbanks Ferry links this to the Sandbanks area of Poole on the eastern edge of the harbour.

== Intersecting and connecting paths ==
From Plymouth to Poole the South West Coast Path forms part of the route of the E9 European Coastal Path which runs for 3,125 miles (5,000 km) from Cabo de São Vicente in Portugal to Narva-Jõesuu in Estonia. The route crosses by ferry from Roscoff to Plymouth, and beyond Poole the path follows the Bournemouth Coast Path to Milford on Sea, then the Solent Way (with an Isle of Wight option), South Downs Way, 1066 Country Walk and Saxon Shore Way to Dover, from where it returns to continental Europe. It is also part of the network of routes that form the International Appalachian Trail.

The South West Coast Path, covering such a wide area, inevitably intersects with other, more local, routes, and it connects with many other long-distance paths offering opportunities for even longer expeditions:

- Bournemouth Coast Path, 20 miles (32 km) from Sandbanks to Milford-on-Sea (Dorset and Hampshire)
- Celtic Way — runs from the west of Wales to Stonehenge and then heads south-west to Cornwall, a total of 723 miles (1,164 km)
- Channel to Channel Path, Seaton to Watchet, 80 kilometres (50 mi)
- Coast to Coast, Devon, Wembury to Lynmouth 116 miles (187 km)
- Coleridge Way, 36 miles (58 km) from Nether Stowey in the Quantocks across the Brendon Hills and the fringes of Exmoor National Park to the coast at Porlock.
- East Devon Way, 38 miles (61 km) Exmouth to Lyme Regis
- Exe Valley Way, Devon – runs 45 miles (72 km) from the River Exe estuary to Exmoor
- Liberty Trail, 28 miles (45 km) Ham Hill to Lyme Regis (Somerset, Dorset)
- The Macmillan Ways:
  - Macmillan Way from Abbotsbury in Dorset to Boston, Lincolnshire 288 miles (463 km)
  - Macmillan Way West from Castle Cary in Somerset to Barnstaple in Devon, 101 miles (163 km) (Boston to Barnstaple is 346 miles (557 km)
  - the Macmillan Abbotsbury Langport Link, which creates a 24 miles (39 km) short-cut for walkers from Abbotsbury to Barnstaple, a total of 126 miles (203 km).
- Saints' Way, Padstow — Fowey 26 miles (42 km) (Cornwall)
- Samaritans Way South West, runs 100 miles (161 km) from Bristol to Lynton, but only the section from Bristol to Goathurst is waymarked
- South Hams Way - 100-mile (160 km) path including 50 mi (80 km) of the SWCP in the South Hams area of Devon
- Tarka Trail. Between Ilfracombe and Bideford, the path mostly follows a coastal section of the Tarka Trail. For part of this route, the paths follow the course of disused railway lines: the Ilfracombe Branch Line, between Braunton and Barnstaple, and the Bideford Branch Line, between Barnstaple and Bideford.
- Two Moors Way, Devon — Ivybridge to Lynmouth 103 miles (166 km)
- Wessex Ridgeway, 136 miles (219 km) from Lyme Regis to Marlborough, which combined with The Ridgeway National Trail, the Icknield Way and the Peddars Way National Trail forms the Greater Ridgeway, 362 miles (583 km), from Lyme Regis to Hunstanton on The Wash
- West Devon Way — Okehampton to Plymouth, 36 miles (58 km)
- West Somerset Coast Path — Minehead to Steart Peninsula (linking SWCP to the River Parrett Trail), 25 miles (40 km)

== Public transport ==
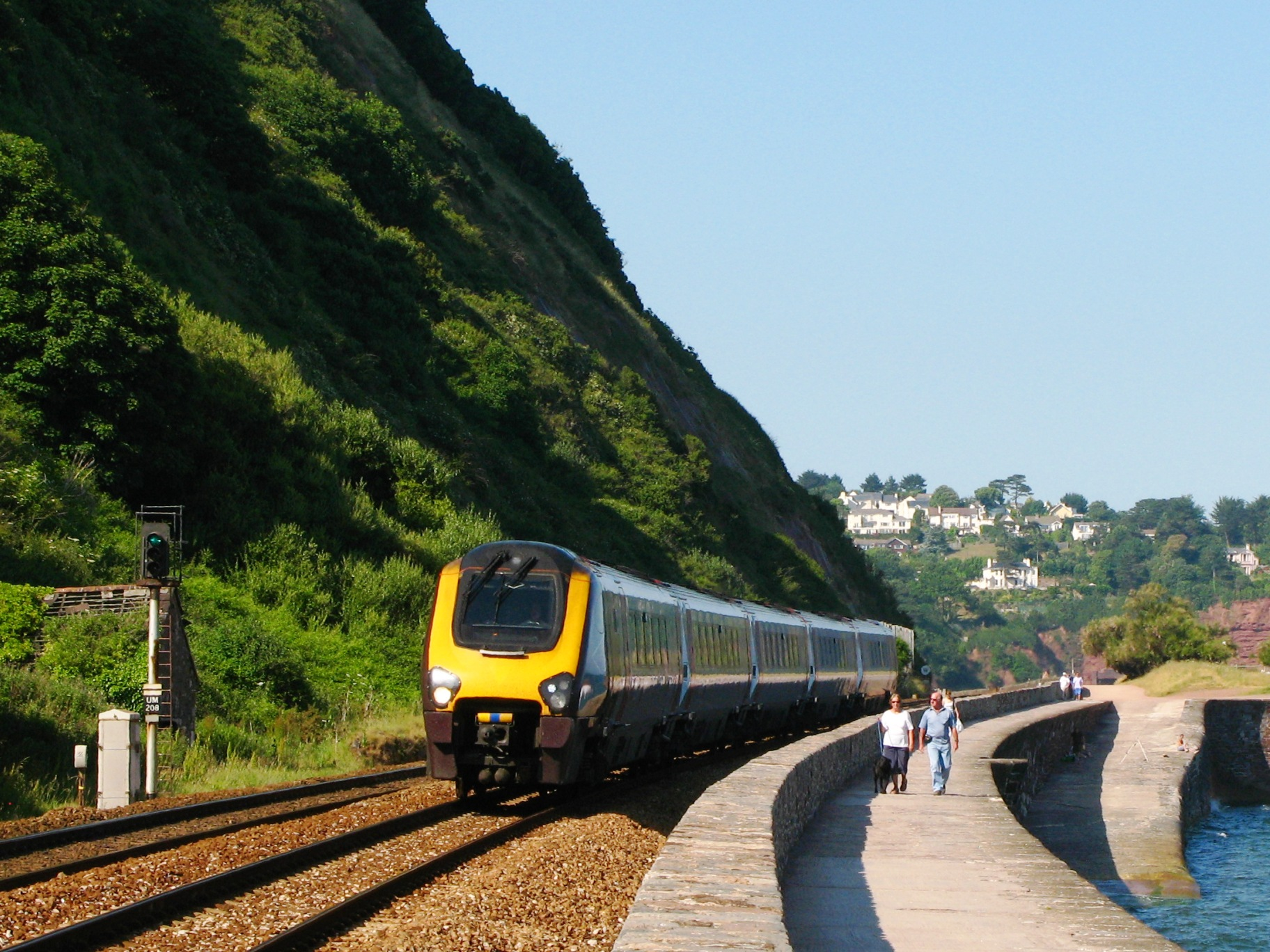
The coast path shares the South Devon Railway sea wall between Teignmouth and Dawlish Warren with long distance and Riviera Line trains

There are regular train services from other parts of the UK to the south west, principal destination stations being Barnstaple, Exeter, Newquay, Penzance, Plymouth and Weymouth. From these places local trains or buses connect to many points of the path. Airports at Bournemouth, Exeter and Newquay are served from a range of national and international destinations.

Using public transport for at least part of the journey means that walkers can plan walks that start and finish at different places, rather than having to circle back to their start point to collect their cars.

More than twenty railway stations give options either for short walks – such as Dawlish to Paignton – or for longer walks over several days. The West Somerset Railway offers steam and diesel services from Taunton to Minehead at the Somerset end of the path (using a connecting bus from Taunton railway station to Bishops Lydeard), the Swanage Railway connects Swanage to Wareham, and the Dartmouth Steam Railway connects Kingswear and Paignton.

Long-distance bus services connect some coastal towns with railway stations:

- Bideford and Westward Ho! to Barnstaple railway station
- Bridport to Axminster railway station and Dorchester South railway station
- Bude to Exeter St Davids railway station
- Lyme Regis to Axminster railway station
- Seaton and Beer to Axminster railway station
- Minehead to Taunton railway station
- Padstow to Bodmin Parkway railway station
- Sidmouth to Honiton railway station
- Swanage and Studland to Bournemouth railway station

A boat service runs down the River Fal from Truro to Falmouth (see Fal River Links), and between Swanage seafront and Poole Quay.

== Charity fundraising ==
Many individuals or organisations use a walk on all or part of the path to raise money for charity.

== See also ==
- King Charles III England Coast Path, the longest coastal trail in the world
