= South Hams Way =

Long-distance footpath in Devon, England

South Hams Way waymark

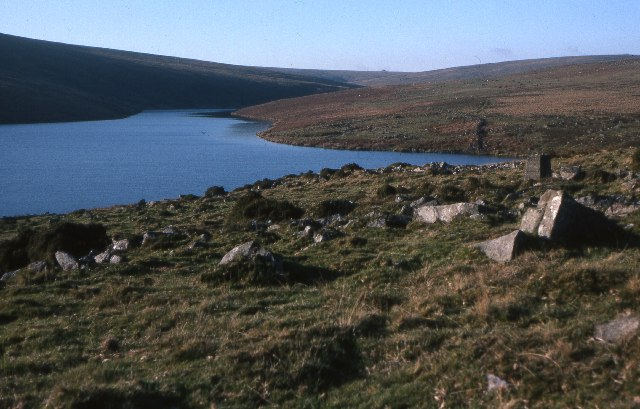
Avon Dam Reservoir, near the highest point on the path

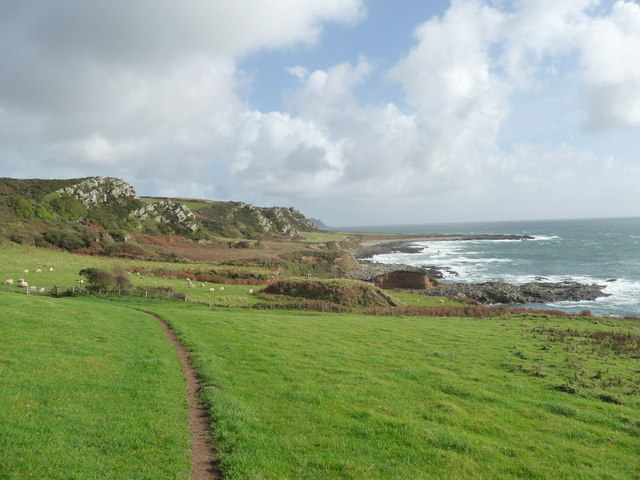
Approaching Prawle Point, the most southerly point on the path

The South Hams Way is a 100-mile (160 km) footpath in Devon, England. It follows a circular route through the South Hams area, includes 50 miles (80 km) of the South West Coast Path from Noss Mayo to Dartmouth, and reaches a height of 1,281 ft (390 m) on Dartmoor. It opened in September 2025.

Although the route is circular it is generally described in an anti-clockwise direction starting and finishing at Totnes, on the River Dart. From here the route heads north west to Buckfastleigh and then follows the Dartmoor Way to Shipley Bridge, reaching its highest point of 1,281 ft (390 m) on the moors above Avon Dam Reservoir. The path then heads south west through South Brent and Ivybridge to meet the South West Coast Path at Noss Mayo on the estuary of the River Yealm. It then follows the coast to the east, crossing the estuaries of the Erme and the Avon to reach Salcombe before rounding Start Point and heading north to Dartmouth and along the Dart estuary to return to Totnes.

The coastal and Dart estuary sections of the walk are within the South Devon National Landscape (formerly known as an Area of Outstanding Natural Beauty or AONB), and the northern section is within the Dartmoor National Park. The path was developed by members of the South Hams group of the Ramblers, and has been waymarked in sections where it is not already waymarked for overlapping routes, except on the open moorland of Dartmoor.
