= South West Coast Path Association =

Charitable organisation based in the United Kingdom

- Founded: May 1973
- Type: UK charity (no. 1163422)
- Purpose: The South West Coast Path
- Location: Residence 2, Royal William Yard, Plymouth Devon, PL1 3RP, England
- Members: 6,679 personal 503 businesses At 31 Dec 2016
- Employees: 10
- Volunteers: 80
- Website: www.southwestcoastpath.org.uk

The South West Coast Path Association (SWCPA) is a United Kingdom charitable incorporated organisation (before 2015 a registered charity) which exists to promote the interests of users of the South West Coast Path, the longest National Trail in Britain at 630 miles (1014 km).

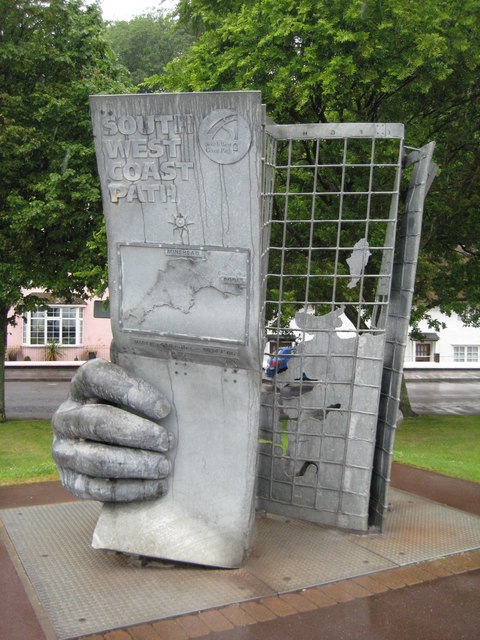
Marker at the Minehead end of the path, part funded by the Association

The Objects of the SWCPA as set out in its constitution are:

1: To secure the protection, improvement and conservation of the South West Coast Path and public access to it in order to improve the health and wellbeing of the general public. 2: To educate the general public to a greater knowledge of, respect and care for, the coast and countryside by promoting the South West Coast Path.

The SWCPA was founded in 1973 as the South West Way Association and renamed in 1999 when the path itself was renamed. In September 2015 it changed its status to become a Charitable incorporated organisation. As of 31 December 2016 it had 6,679 personal members, who receive twice-yearly newsletters and an annual guide to the path (available for sale to non-members), and 503 business members.

Over the years the SWCPA has worked with local authorities and the National Trust to improve the alignment and condition of the path. It contributed funds towards the sculptures erected at Minehead and Poole to mark the ends of the path, and a half-way marker.

== Publications ==
- South West Coast Path Association (2017). Complete Guide. SWCPA. ISBN 978-0-907055-24-2. (new edition published in January every year; free to members)
- South West Coast Path Association (2006). Reverse Guide. SWCPA. (describes route from Poole to Minehead; available from the Association)
- Carter, Philip (2005). The South West Coast Path, an illustrated history. SWCPA.

== See also ==
- South West Coast Path
