= Bournemouth Coast Path =

20-mile footpath in southern England

Coordinates: 50.685°N 1.949°W

The Bournemouth Coast Path is a 20-mile-long footpath through Dorset and Hampshire, England from Sandbanks to Milford-on-Sea.

The path follows the coastline and goes through Bournemouth, Boscombe, Southbourne, Hengistbury Head, Mudeford and Highcliffe.

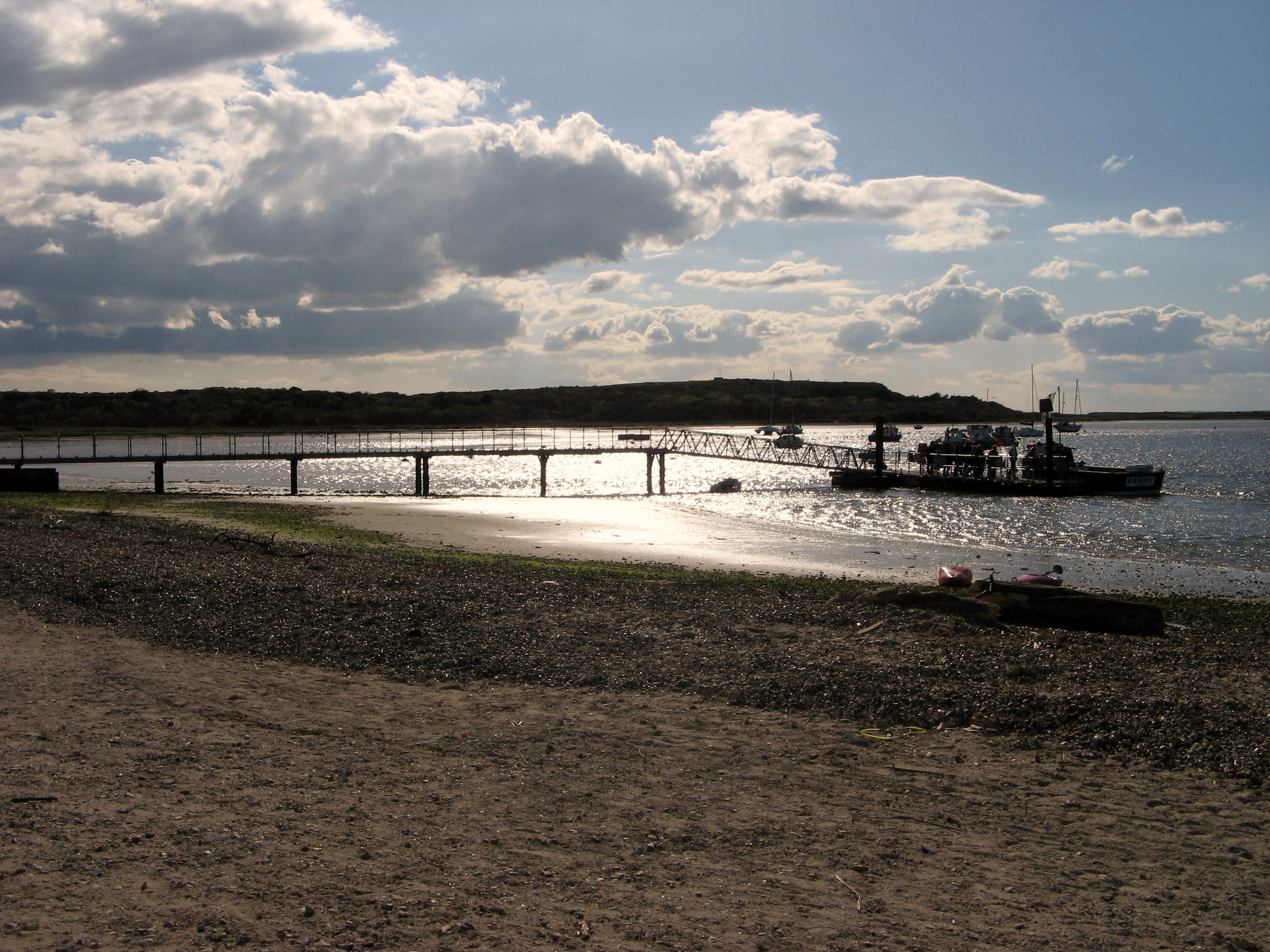
Ferry at Hengistbury Head

Between Hengistbury Head and Mudeford the path uses a ferry to cross Christchurch Harbour. In winter, when the ferry does not usually run, there is a 3-mile detour through Christchurch.

The Bournemouth Coast Path performs an important role by connecting the South West Coast Path (by the Sandbanks Ferry) in the west and the Solent Way in the east.

== See also ==
- Long-distance footpaths in the UK
