= Hell's Mouth, Cornwall =

Bay near Camborne, Cornwall, England

Coordinates: 50°14′15″N 5°21′44″W

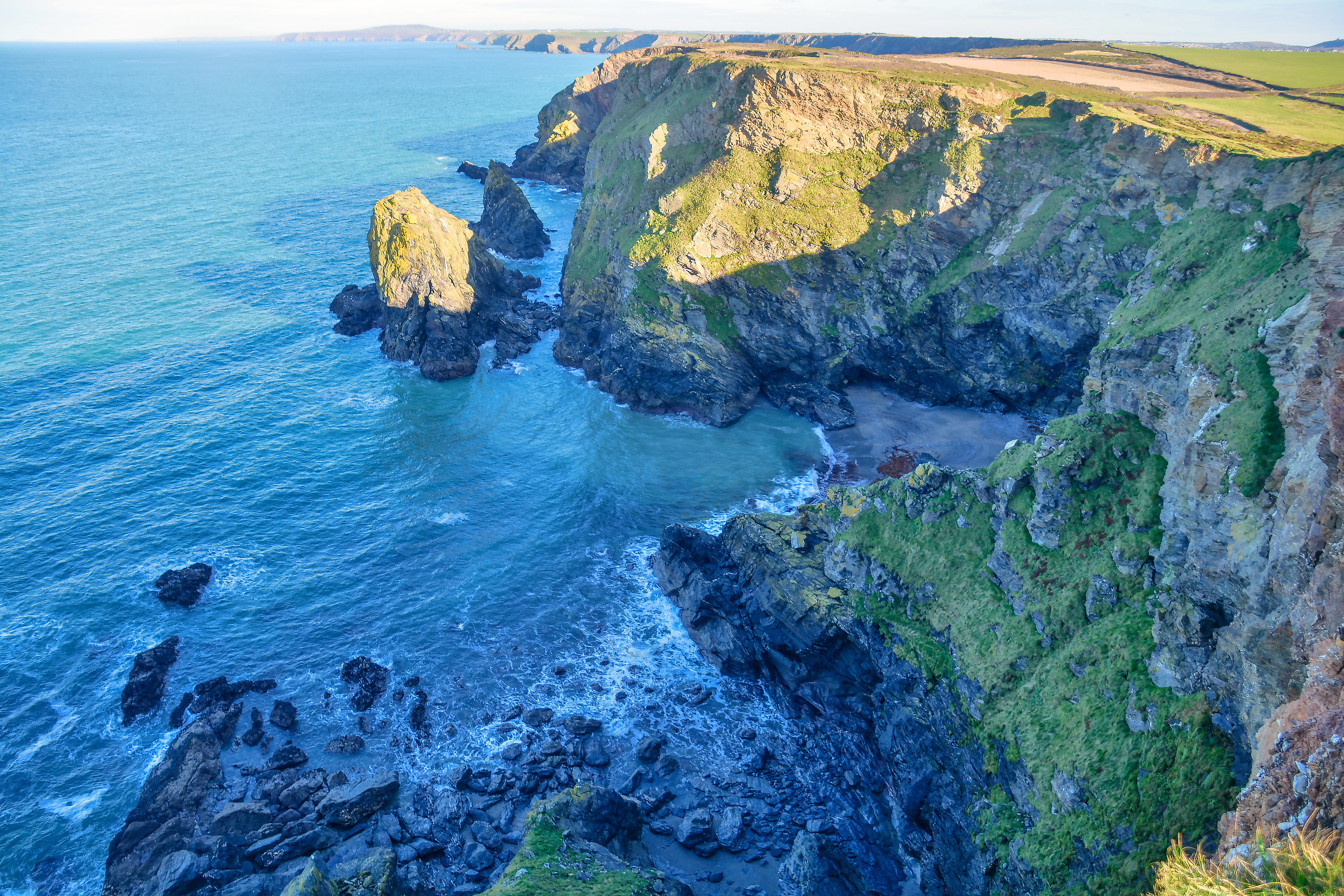
Looking down into Hell's Mouth from the cliffs above

Hell's Mouth is a cove on the north coast of Cornwall, England, near Camborne. It is surrounded by precipitous cliffs. The South West Coast Path runs along the edge of the cliffs, and there is a cafe nearby.

In September 2011, a jogger reported that a large crack had formed in the path above the cove. Four days later, around 100,000 tonnes of rock tumbled down into the sea. Unusually, the rockfall was captured on video.
