= Gerrans Bay to Camels Cove =

Protected area in Cornwall, England

Coordinates: 50.2061°N 4.9304°W

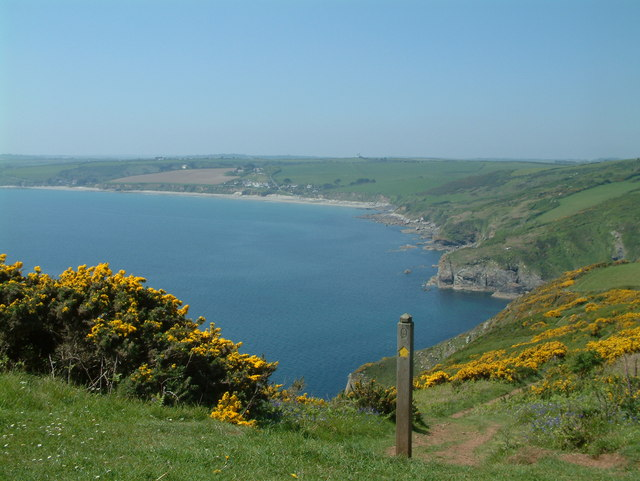
View of Gerrans Bay from Nare Head

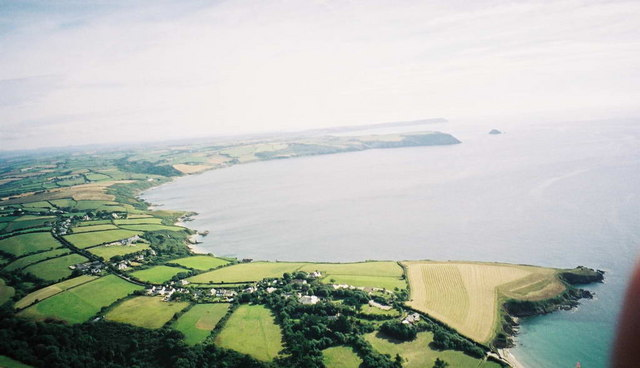
Aerial view of Gerrans Bay

Gerrans Bay to Camels Cove is a coastal Site of Special Scientific Interest (SSSI) in south Cornwall, England, UK, noted for both its biological and geological interest.

== Geography ==
The 139.5-hectare (345-acre) site, notified in 1951, is situated on the south Cornish coast of the English Channel, 6 miles (9.7 km) south-east of the city of Truro. It starts at Creek Stephen Point in the west, following the coast of Gerrans Bay to Nare Head and then on to Manare Point, near Portloe in the east and also includes Gull Rock off the coast.

The South West Coast Path runs through the SSSI and most of the coastline is owned by the National Trust.

The site lies within the Cornwall Area of Outstanding Natural Beauty (AONB).

== History ==
This site is an amalgamation of two previous SSSIs; Gerrans Bay to Nare Head SSSI and Camels Cove SSSI.
