= Zone Point =

Coastal feature in Cornwall, England

Coordinates: 50°08.35′N 05°0.5′W

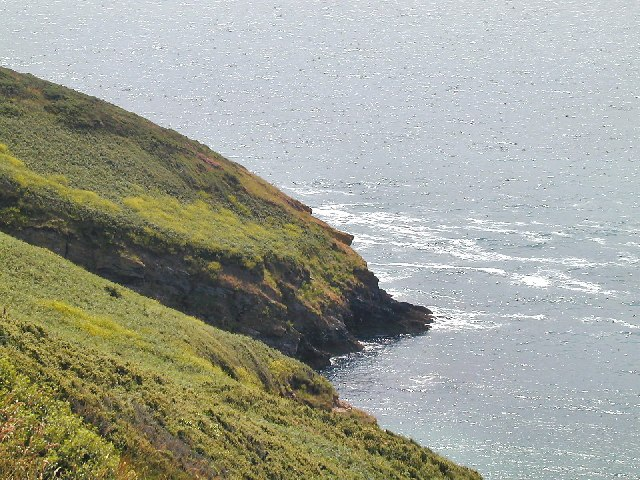
Zone Point, seen from the coastal footpath

Zone Point (Cornish: Sawan Hir, meaning long chasm) is the southernmost extremity of the Roseland peninsula extending into Falmouth Bay near St Mawes in Cornwall, England, United Kingdom at grid reference SW8430.

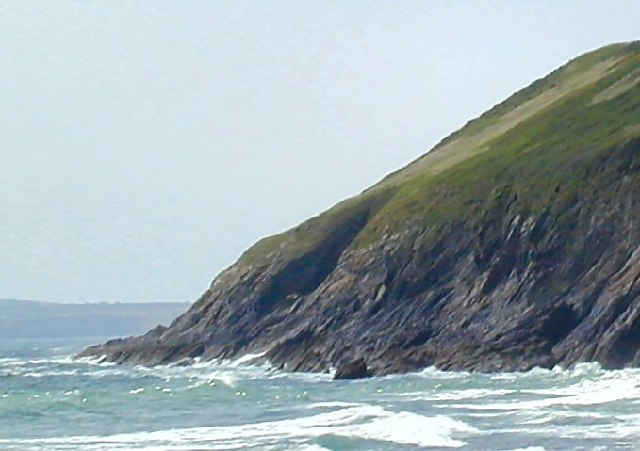
Seen from Porthbeor Beach

It is approximately 500 metres (550 yards) east-southeast of the St. Anthony's Lighthouse on St Anthony Head. The cliffs make the beach between Zone Point and St Anthony Head inaccessible from land and the small bay is the site of many Atlantic grey seal sightings; Atlantic grey seal pups can be seen on this beach from the headland and the sea.

The top of Zone Point is pasture with scrubby slopes. The South West Coast Path marks the transition between the two ecotypes.

The origin of the name Zone Point first appears in the 1597 map of the River Fal by Baptista Boazio as Savenheer, or the long coved point.
