= Braunton Academy =

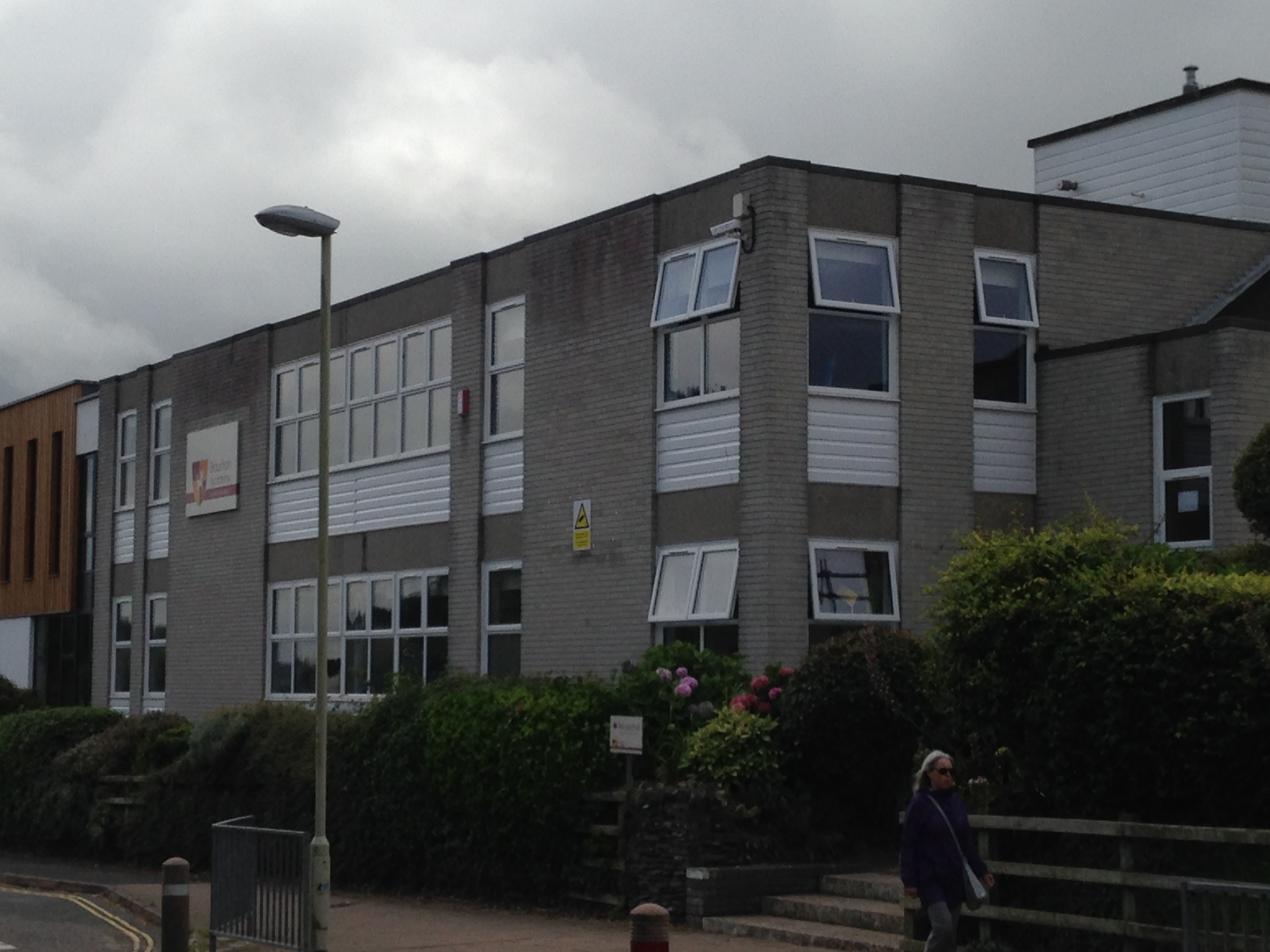

Location
- Barton Lane; Braunton, Devon, EX33 2BP; England
- Coordinates: 51°06′10″N 4°09′23″W

Information
- Type: Academy
- Motto: Aspire and Achieve
- Department for Education URN: 138041 Tables
- Ofsted: Reports
- Principal: Fay Bowler
- Gender: Mixed
- Age: 11 to 16
- Enrolment: 753
- Capacity: 750
- Houses: Putsbough, Croyde, Saunton & Woolacombe
- Colours: Green, Yellow, Red & Blue
- Website: http://www.braunton.academy/

Braunton Academy (formerly Braunton School and Community College) is a coeducational secondary school with academy status in Braunton, North Devon, England. The school specialises in mathematics and computing.

The school first opened in 1937 with 140 pupils, and now has around 740 pupils aged 11 to 16.

The school has various sports facilities, which include four tennis courts, a climbing wall, a dance studio, access to Tweedies Field and the North Devon Athletics Track. A new multi-usage games area was opened in 2014 supported by Fullabrook and is used by the school as well as being accessible to local primary schools and to other sports clubs.

Braunton Academy secured £750,000 from the government to build a new library, reception and supported study centre which opened in Spring 2015.

== Principals ==
- 1992 – 1997: Mr Hunkin
- 1997 – 1999: Mr Roff (acting)
- 1999 – 2001: Mr Scutt
- 2002 – 2006: Mr V Game
- 2006 – 2014: David Sharratt
- September 2014 – July 2021: Michael Cammack
- September 2021 – Present: Fay Bowler

== House and Tutor Systems ==
=== Houses ===
Braunton Academy has four houses, each with their own colour: Croyde (yellow), Putsborough (green), Saunton (red) and Woolacombe (blue). They are named after 4 of the beaches in the local North Devon area.

=== Tutors ===
Braunton Academy's tutor group system was originally vertical, with students from all 5 year groups making up a tutor. This was then changed to have distinct KS3 and KS4 groups, with students changing to their KS4 tutor at the end of Year 9.

In September 2018, the tutors were switched to a horizontal system, with students in the same year from all 4 houses making up a group, which they would stay in up until Year 11.
