= Braunton Burrows =

UK sand dune system

- Site of Special Scientific Interest
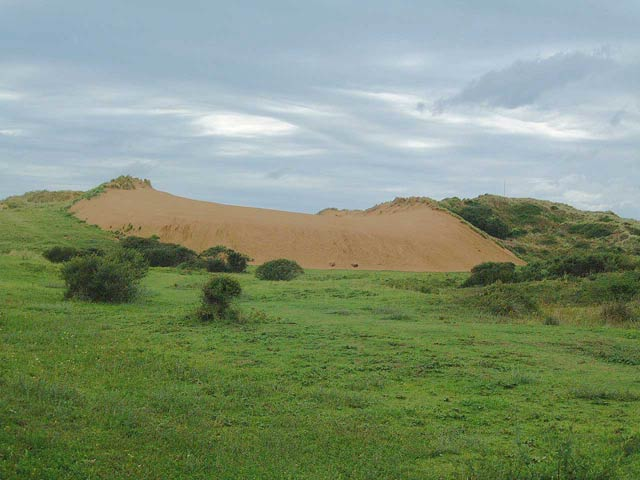
- Flagpole Dune - A major blowout encouraged to feed sand into the surrounding area.

- Location within Devon
- Location of Braunton Burrows.
- Area of search: North Devon
- Grid reference: SS457352
- Coordinates: 51.097°N 4.213°W
- Interest: Biological and Geological
- Area: 1,356.7 hectares (13.567 km^{2}; 5.238 sq mi)
- Notification date: 1952 (part); 1969 (full)

Braunton Burrows is a sand dune system on the North Devon coast. It is privately owned and forms part of the Christie Devon Estates Trust (see Tapeley Park). Braunton Burrows is a prime British sand dune site, the largest sand dune system (psammosere) in England. It is particularly important ecologically because it includes the complete successional range of dune plant communities, with over 470 vascular plant species. The short turf communities are very rich in lichens and herbs, and the dune slacks are also rich. The many rare plants and animals include 14 with UK Biodiversity Action Plans. For example, this is one of only two sites in the UK for the Amber Sandbowl Snail Catinella arenaria, which is found on the wet dune slacks.

== History ==
The Devon historian Tristram Risdon (d.1640) wrote as follows:

"Santon is in the parish of Branton, not unaptly so termed the Town by the Sand, that hath overblown many hundred acres of land. And near this hamlet the country people had so undermined a hill of sand, by digging it to carry it into their grounds, that a great quantity thereof fell down, discovering the top of a tree, which by farther search was found to be thirty feet in length, so that it plainly appeareth this circuit of marsh land (now, of the sands overblowing, called the Burrows) was in elder ages stored with woods and tall timber trees".

Similar stories exist in respect of the south coast of Glamorgan, across the Bristol Channel, regarding the Merthyr Mawr Sand Dunes which started shifting in the late 14th century and encroached on Kenfig Castle, resulting in its evacuation but which spared Candleston Castle, now almost surrounded by dunes.

== Civilian use ==
A lifeboat station was opened on Braunton Burrows in 1848, although its crew always came from the established Appledore Lifeboat Station on the other side of the estuary. It was closed in 1918 as it was difficult to find men and horses to launch the boat following World War I.

It is used, particularly by local people, for a range of leisure activities, particularly dog-walking, from three large car parks adjacent to the site. There is a long tradition of scientific research, particularly botanical. Tourism is an important use of the area in summer. The more isolated parts of the Burrows are noted for naturism.

== Military use ==
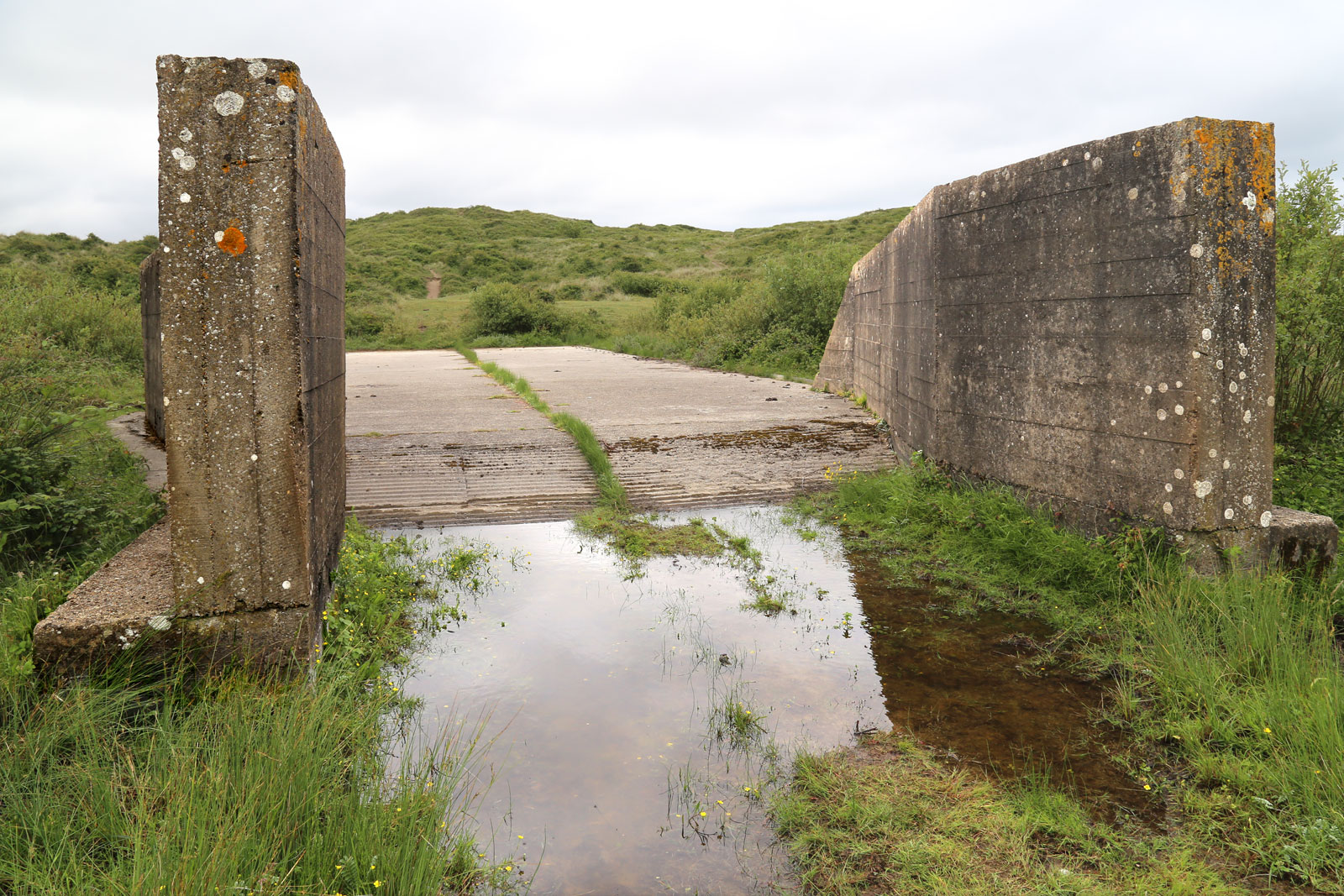
Concrete replica Landing craft built in 1943 for practice before D-Day

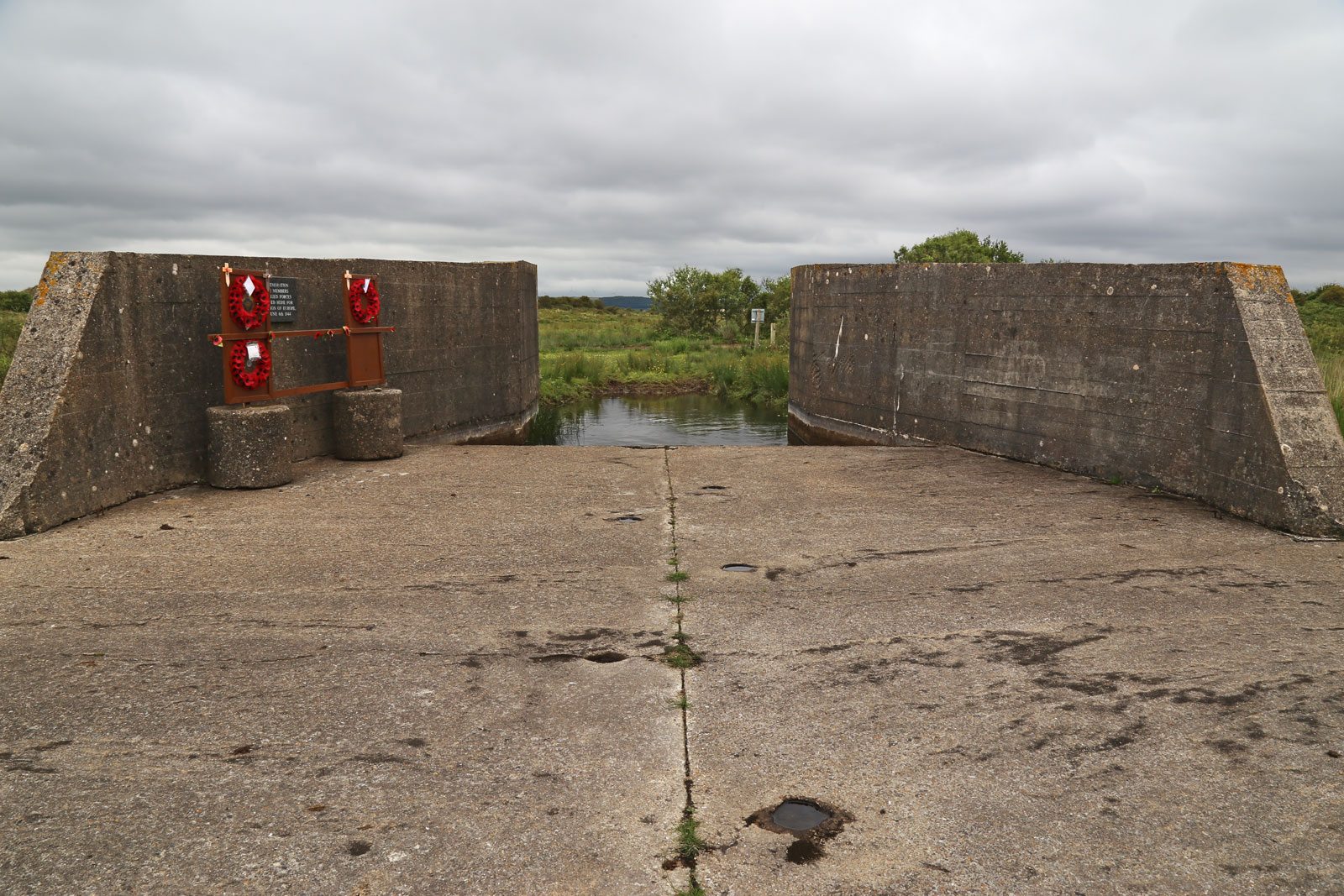
Braunton Burrows concrete landing craft with memorial plaque

Braunton Burrows played an important role during the Second World War. In 1943 Lieutenant Colonel Paul W. Thompson was tasked with training the Americans for their assault on the heavily defended Normandy beaches.

All good training ground had been claimed by the British and so Thompson had no choice but to accept the Atlantic coast near Braunton. The perimeter of the land he needed did in fact stretch south from Mortehoe Station to Braunton, and the River Caen to the Taw Torridge Estuary. Every acre was needed for exercise and for rehearsals using live ammunition, explosives, tanks, artillery and air support – all of which became features of the US Assault Training Centre.

The beaches were considered suitable for amphibious exercises, despite the strong Atlantic surf. The nearby beaches were identified as closely resembling Omaha beach in terms of sand quality, beach gradient and tidal range. Woolacombe and Saunton were noted for their similarities to the terrain of Omaha Beach.

Thompson was originally tasked with teaching the troops how to neutralise the enemy beach defences and then fight their way inland, although the second part of his mission was later relocated to Slapton beach in South Devon.

Ranges for all weapons were required in order to help the troops practice and construction of such ranges and other aids had to be carried out quickly, as the first units arrived in North Devon on 1 September 1943. 8 Replica landing craft made from concrete can still be found at the southern end of the Burrows. Two of the structures replicate LCMs while six replicate LCTs

As winter approached, a permanent camp was needed; most troops had been accommodated in tents until then. 505 Nissen huts were erected to house 4250 men.

Some of the narrow country lanes were made one-way for ease of use and where no metalled roads existed temporary tracks were laid. One such track is the old ferry way, which extended from the south end of Sandy Lane across the back of the dunes to the White House near Crow Point. This road was widened and straightened and exists today as ‘the American Road’.

The site is currently leased by the Ministry of Defence from the Christie Devon Estates Trust (see Tapeley Park). The area is closed for 10 days per year for military training. The fact that it is so difficult to navigate makes it ideal for land-based exercises, although the sandy conditions are useful to all disciplines. The Royal Air Force sometimes use Saunton Sands to practice STOL beach landing and take off with the Lockheed C-130 Hercules. The Royal Marines also occasionally use the beach to practice amphibious landings.

== Lighthouses ==
=== Crow Point Lighthouse ===
Crow Point Lighthouse
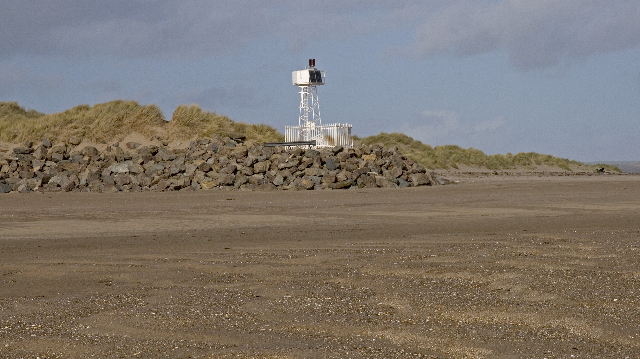
- Crow Point Lighthouse
- Location: Appledore; Devon; England
- Coordinates: 51°03′58″N 4°11′23″W

Tower
- Constructed: 1954
- Construction: metal skeletal tower
- Height: 5 m (16 ft)
- Shape: square pyramidal tower with balcony and light
- Markings: white tower
- Power source: solar power
- Operator: Trinity House

Light
- Focal height: 7.6 m (25 ft)
- Lens: 300mm fixed drum lens
- Intensity: 182 candela
- Range: 6 nmi (11 km)
- Characteristic: Fl WR 2.5s.

Situated at the south end of Braunton Burrows is Crow Point Lighthouse, which guides vessels navigating the Taw and Torridge estuary. Erected in 1954, the lighthouse is a small tubular steel structure, powered when first built by acetylene gas, then from 1978 by electricity and now by solar power following conversion in 1987. Modernised in 2001, it currently displays a sector light indicating safe passage in and out of the River Taw. It is operated by Trinity House.

=== Bideford Bar leading lights ===
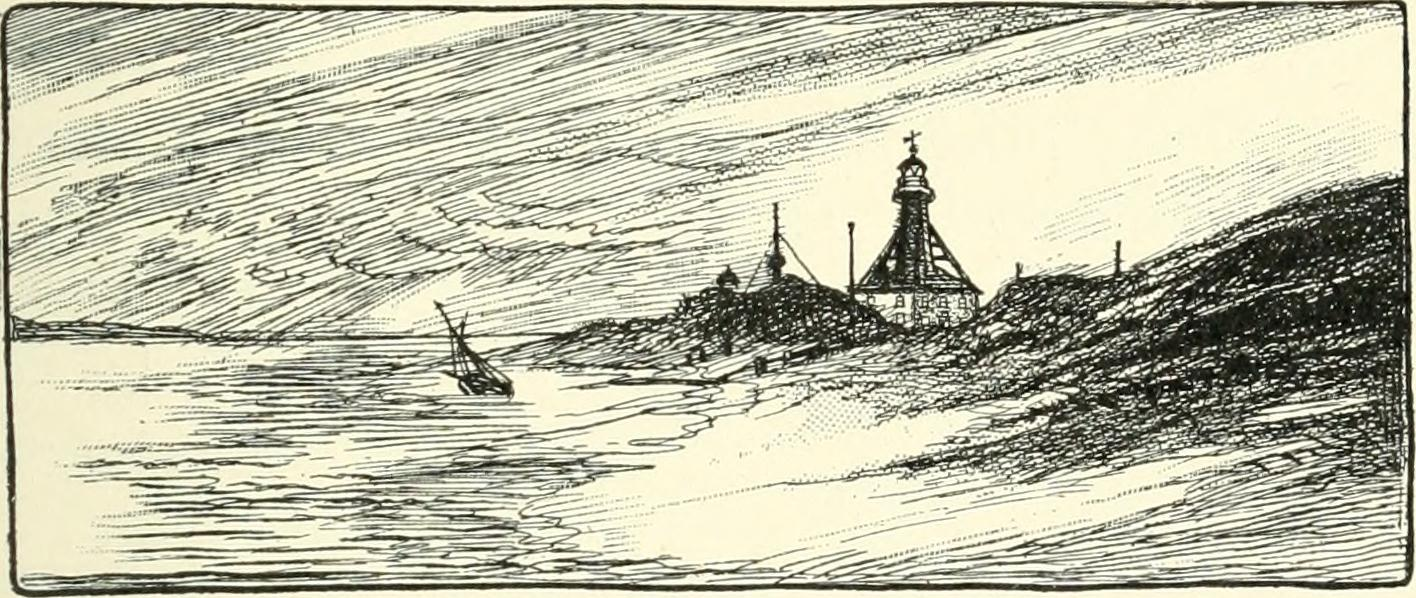
Sketch of the high lighthouse from an early 20th-century guidebook.

A much larger structure formerly stood, alongside the estuary, north-west of the current light: Bideford High lighthouse (also known as Braunton Lighthouse) consisted of an octagonal wooden tower built on top of keepers' accommodation, 86 foot high in total. There was also an associated low light. The low light was 300 metres to the north-west of the main light; when the two were aligned, as seen from a vessel in Bideford Bay, they provided a bearing for the safe passage through the shoals in the estuary. The lower light was contained in a wooden shed mounted on a short railway running perpendicular to the shore, so that it could be moved to keep pace with the dynamically shifting shoals; for example, between 1820 and 1832 it had to be winched 34 m to the north-east, while in the following twelve years it had to be winched back to the south-west by 90 m. Designed by Joseph Nelson, both lighthouses were built in 1819 and came into use the following year; both were painted white and each was lit by a single Argand light mounted within a parabolic reflector. The Low Light was rebuilt in 1832. In the 19th century the lights were tidal: rather than being lit all night, they were only displayed between half-flood and half-ebb, when they signalled safe passage over Bideford Bar (a notorious sand bank which renders entry into the Taw Torridge Estuary hazardous at low tide).

In 1879 the High Light began to be displayed all night, regardless of the state of the tide. This was one of a number of improvements undertaken to the light in association with the establishment of Bull Point Lighthouse further to the north. It was around this time that a lantern was added to the top of the tower (transplanted from one of the decommissioned Casquets lighthouse towers) and the light was made dioptric. At the same time the visible arc of the light was increased to seaward (and in addition it was made visible, as a less powerful light, to the south and east for harbour navigation). Not long afterwards, in 1889, the High Light was made occulting (the light being eclipsed for two seconds every thirty seconds). The Low Light remained tidal (later an additional red or green light signalled the state of the tide, and a spherical daymark was used during hours of daylight). In 1890 each lighthouse was painted with a vertical red stripe on the seaward side.

In 1945 the two lighthouse keepers were withdrawn as the ground under the High Light (where they lived) was becoming unstable. Plans were put in place for the High Light tower to be replaced and for both lights to be equipped with acetylene lamps (which would not require a keeper in full-time attendance); however the structure remained in use for a further 12 years. Latterly both lights were classed as 'unwatched', and they displayed occulting lights.

After the establishment of Crow Point Light, both the old Braunton lights were demolished in 1957 and a new pair of leading lights were erected east of the estuary, at Instow.

== Designations ==
- UNESCO Biosphere Reserve
- National nature reserve (part)
- SSSI
- Ramsar site
- Special Area of Conservation
- North Devon AONB
- North Devon Heritage Coast

Part of the site was de-declared as an NNR in 1996 because of a disagreement over grazing management practices between the landowner Christie Devon Estates Trust and English Nature. This de-declaration was a unique occurrence.

Braunton Burrows forms the core area of North Devon's Biosphere Reserve.

== Dune plant communities ==
The site is the second largest sand dune system in the UK and an important part of the North Devon UNESCO Biosphere Reserve. At least 470 species of plants have been recorded. This number in such a small area means that Braunton has been considered the parish in England containing the largest number of wild plants. These include many plants of common species as well as several unusual ones, such as sea stock, sea clover and sand toadflax. It is one of two sites in England for water germander. As well as flowering plants, many mosses, lichens and liverworts live among the dunes. over 60 species of lichen have been recorded.

One consequence of the plant diversity is that there are diverse populations of insects. Over half of the species of butterfly found in the UK have been recorded within Braunton Burrows.

== Scrub invasion ==
Scrub invasion is managed to maintain a state of semi-equilibrium and prevent succession to a climax community. The methods of scrub management used have become a point of contention between the various parties involved with the site.

During the 1970s invasion of coarse grasses were managed largely by rabbit grazing. The spread of myxomatosis resulted in rabbit population decline and consequent encroachment of species rich turf by scrub species such as privet Ligustrum vulgare and heather Calluna vulgaris. Decline in species diversity was exacerbated through the introduction of sea buckthorn Hippophae rhamnoides by the military. This attempt at dune stabilisation was implemented after preparations for the Normandy landings caused widespread erosion. Deep rooted species such as bramble, hawthorn and willow were also able to flourish and resulted in several sallow carr communities. These species were maintained and species rich turf later established through a combination of management techniques.

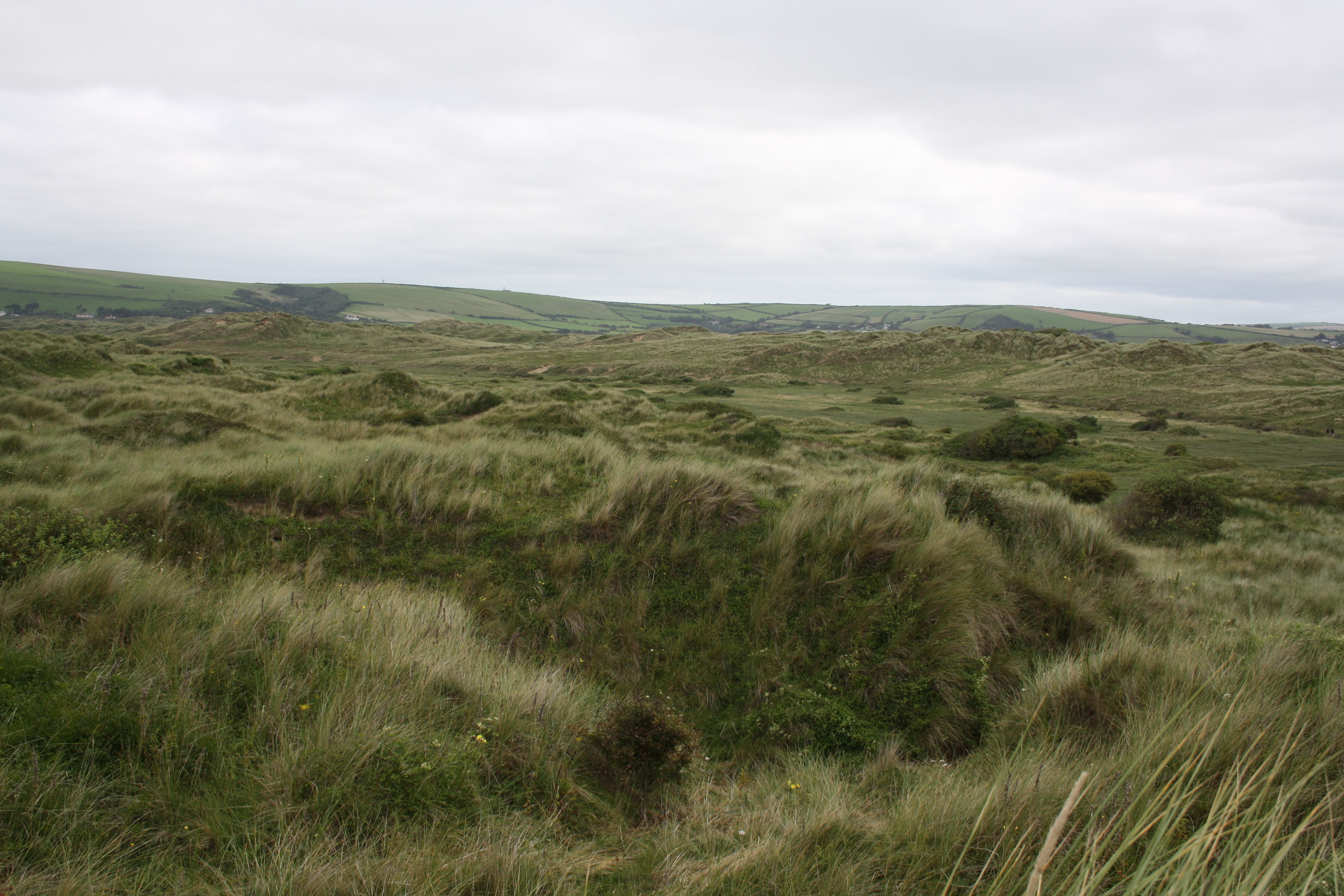
Braunton Burrows, August 2009

The burning of deep rooted species often made the soil more fertile but led to the spread of coarse grasses. These grasses were later managed by mowing in combination with grazing by soay sheep and cattle.

Grazing was viewed by the Christies Estates Trust as exacerbating erosion and hence damaging to species diversity. The trust therefore opposed the introduction of sheep and cattle to the site. However English Nature felt that this turnover was erosive but nevertheless was less invasive than mowing. English Nature felt the turnover of soil increased species diversity and with the use of soay sheep, maintained a desirable balance to ecosystems. It was this disagreement that was the main factor which led to the de-designation of the site as a national nature reserve in 1996.

In the twenty-first century the use of tracked and off-road vehicles on parts of the site for training by the Ministry of Defence, overseen by Natural England, contributes to control of scrub and also creates open soil that is essential for some of the plant species. North Devon cattle and wild rabbits also continue to graze on the area.

== See also ==
- North Devon Coast AONB
- North Devon's Biosphere Reserve
