= Braunton =

Village in Devon, England

Coordinates: 51.11°N 4.162°W

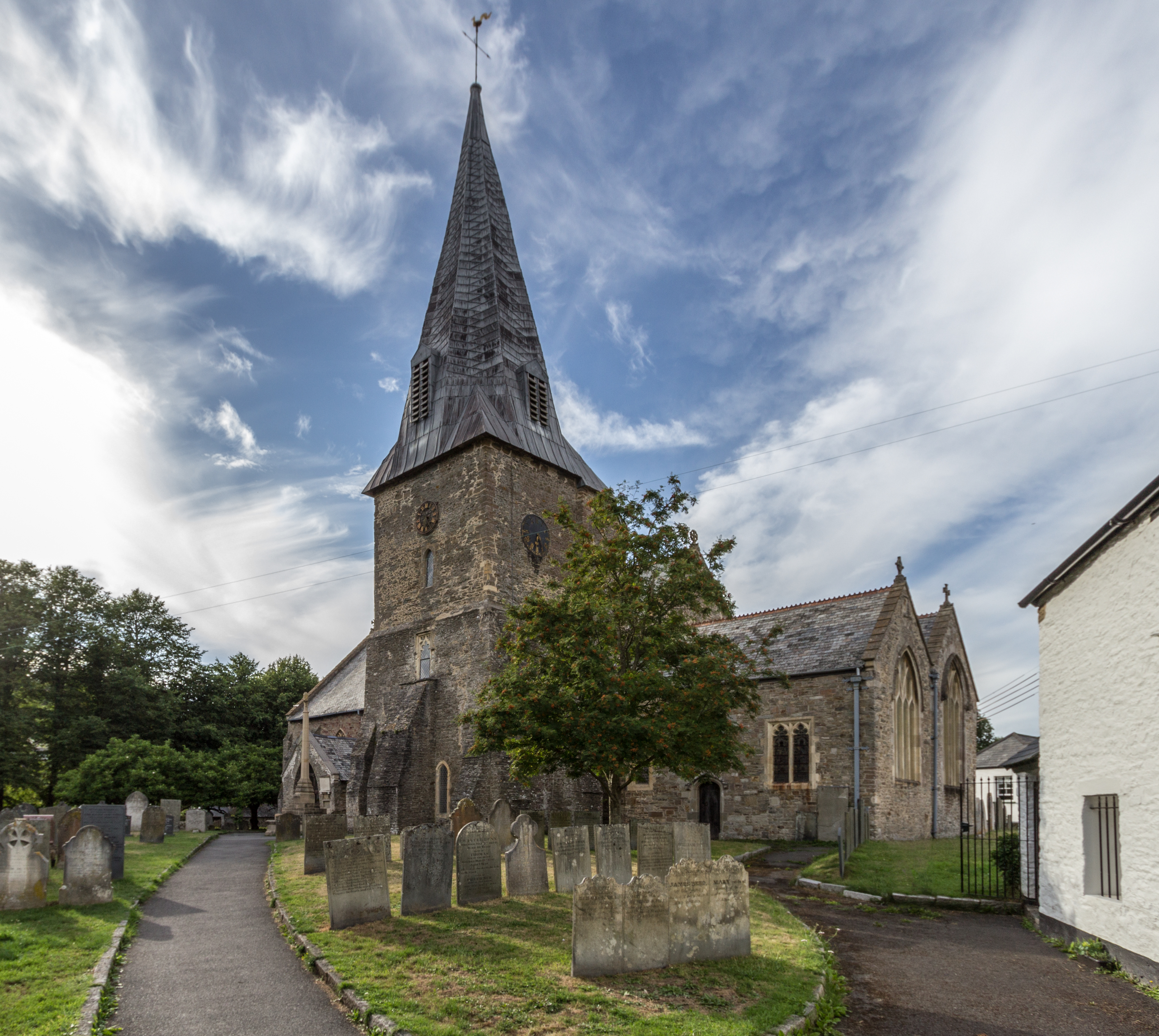
- St Brannock's Church, Braunton

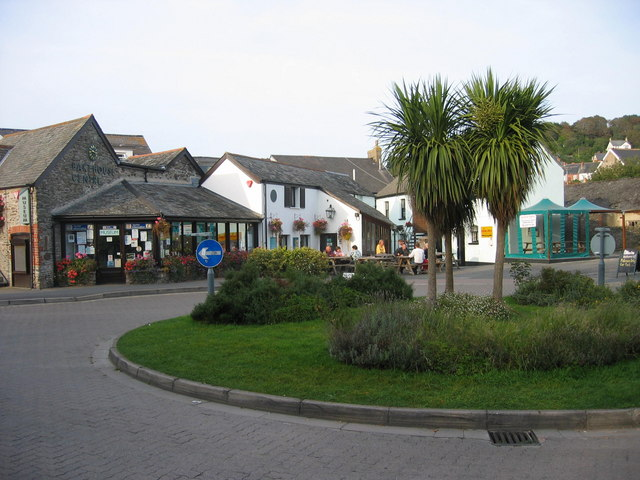
- Village Green

- Location within Devon
- Population: 7,353 (2011)
- OS grid reference: SS485365
- Civil parish: Braunton
- District: North Devon
- Shire county: Devon
- Region: South West
- Country: England
- Sovereign state: United Kingdom
- Post town: BRAUNTON
- Postcode district: EX33
- Dialling code: 01271
- Police: Devon and Cornwall
- Fire: Devon and Somerset
- Ambulance: South Western
- UK Parliament: North Devon

Braunton is a large village, civil parish, ecclesiastical parish and former manor in Devon. The village is situated 5 miles (8 km) west of Barnstaple. It is one of the largest villages in Devon with a population at the 2021 census of 10,217 people. There are two electoral wards (East and West). Their joint population at the above census was 8,218. Within the parish is the fertile, low-lying Braunton Great Field, which adjoins the undulating Braunton Burrows, the Core Area in North Devon Biosphere Reserve, the largest psammosere (sand dune system) in England. It confronts the Atlantic Ocean at the west of the parish at the large beach of Saunton Sands, one of the South West's international-standard surfing beaches.

== Toponymy ==
The origin of the name Braunton is unclear; there are two likely explanations for the name. The first is that the name comes from the common name Brampton, derived from "a town where broom grew". The other explanation is that it could be named after St Brannock. Neither of these explanations fit perfectly, and the origin of this name will likely remain a mystery.

== Topography ==
The South West Coast Path National Trail passes through the village and gives access for walkers to the spectacular North Devon coast. The Tarka Trail also passes through the village. Braunton Burrows marsh on the west side of the parish is a designated biosphere reserve, the first place in Great Britain to have gained such status. The coastal part of the parish lies within the North Devon Coast Area of Outstanding Natural Beauty, and comprises Saunton Sands to the west, a beach of finely-grained sand, and to the south the estuary of the River Taw, of mixed mud and sand. The north of Braunton Burrows are open to light public access and have been converted into a Links Golf Course. Braunton was half-surrounded by an extensive brackish salt-water marsh restricting available agricultural land. In 1808 this was surveyed by Charles Vancouver, for the Board of Agriculture, who recommended that the marsh should be enclosed and reclaimed. This met with local approval and James Green was appointed as engineer for the drainage scheme. An Act of Parliament was obtained for the purpose on 25 May 1811. (Note: Its purpose as set out in its cover description was "the Inclosing, Draining and Embanking Lands in Braunton, in the County of Devon.") On completion, responsibility for the marsh passed Marsh Inspectors, who sanctioned further work in 1854, involving the straightening and embanking of the River Caen, or Braunton Pill, to form the Braunton Canal. The scheme was completed by the addition of a new quay at Velator in the 1870s.

To the West of Braunton is Saunton and its beach and the sand dune system but bordering the village is what is reputed to be the largest remaining 'strip' farming area in the UK and which known as the 'Great Field' . Probably from medieval times and continuing today, this large area has been opened tilled without formal boundaries, with at least 3 families still involved in production. This boundary effect by the 'Great Field' now acts as a 'natural' barrier to the development of the town in that direction.

During building works in the end of the 20th century, two strange findings revealed something of the areas geology. In one area of the village high on the side of the hill and about 100 feet (30 metres) above the flat area of the village, excavations for 1 m deep foundations of a house broke in to a pocket of sand which was found to extend greater than 5 m. The subsequent house had to be built on a raft on the sand. The sand was understood to have been examined by Exeter University, who considered it to have been a pocket pushed up by a glacier during the last ice age. At similar time in the flat area of the village, excavations for foundations revealed large sooth, rounded stones which were put down to a wide water course having been present at some time, rather than the small river that flows through the village now.

Braunton railway station formerly existed on the now closed Ilfracombe Branch Line two stations from Barnstaple railway station on the 'Tarka' or North Devon Line from Exeter, which currently operate regular and heritage trains.

The presence of the river, the 'soft' water and permission for abstraction, encouraged an American company, 'Curity' to set up business in the village in the early 60's for the purposes of bleaching and processing imported raw cotton wool from the US into various products such as cotton wool balls, and rolls of perfectly white cotton for other companies to make such products as tampons and other medical/surgical products. Despite being in operation for about 40 years, the softness of the water and minimal [resin] 'ion exchange' meant that the 'Steambloc' boilers needed no treatment or aggressive cleaning.

== Climate ==
Braunton experiences a temperate oceanic climate (Cfb) with temperatures heavily moderated due to its proximity to the Atlantic - although Braunton is not a coastal town.

Climate data for Chivenor (1991–2020 normals)
Month	Jan	Feb	Mar	Apr	May	Jun	Jul	Aug	Sep	Oct	Nov	Dec	Year
Record high °C (°F)	15.3 (59.5)	18.9 (66.0)	21.5 (70.7)	25.1 (77.2)	31.3 (88.3)	35.1 (95.2)	34.8 (94.6)	34.3 (93.7)	29.5 (85.1)	26.4 (79.5)	18.6 (65.5)	17.7 (63.9)	35.1 (95.2)
Mean daily maximum °C (°F)	9.1 (48.4)	9.4 (48.9)	11.2 (52.2)	13.7 (56.7)	16.5 (61.7)	19.0 (66.2)	20.5 (68.9)	20.5 (68.9)	18.8 (65.8)	15.4 (59.7)	12.1 (53.8)	9.7 (49.5)	14.7 (58.5)
Daily mean °C (°F)	6.4 (43.5)	6.5 (43.7)	7.8 (46.0)	9.8 (49.6)	12.6 (54.7)	15.2 (59.4)	16.9 (62.4)	17.0 (62.6)	15.2 (59.4)	12.3 (54.1)	9.2 (48.6)	6.9 (44.4)	11.3 (52.3)
Mean daily minimum °C (°F)	3.7 (38.7)	3.5 (38.3)	4.4 (39.9)	5.9 (42.6)	8.6 (47.5)	11.4 (52.5)	13.3 (55.9)	13.4 (56.1)	11.5 (52.7)	9.2 (48.6)	6.2 (43.2)	4.1 (39.4)	8.0 (46.4)
Record low °C (°F)	−10.4 (13.3)	−9.0 (15.8)	−5.0 (23.0)	−3.0 (26.6)	0.0 (32.0)	1.6 (34.9)	5.6 (42.1)	6.0 (42.8)	1.9 (35.4)	−3.1 (26.4)	−7.0 (19.4)	−9.3 (15.3)	−10.4 (13.3)
Average precipitation mm (inches)	90.1 (3.55)	69.7 (2.74)	59.5 (2.34)	55.3 (2.18)	54.0 (2.13)	64.8 (2.55)	73.7 (2.90)	77.1 (3.04)	69.9 (2.75)	107.0 (4.21)	106.4 (4.19)	107.1 (4.22)	934.4 (36.79)
Average precipitation days (≥ 1.0 mm)	15.2	12.5	11.7	10.4	9.8	10.1	10.5	12.2	11.5	15.2	16.7	16.1	151.8
Mean monthly sunshine hours	59.7	79.3	136.2	194.5	219.6	209.6	203.1	189.8	153.8	107.5	64.2	51.8	1,669.3
Source 1: Met Office
Source 2: Starlings Roost Weather

== History ==
=== Manors ===
Braunton was the chief manor of Braunton Hundred, and had been held by Saxon kings. Between 855 and 860 ten hides in Brannocminster were granted by King Æthelbald of Wessex to Glastonbury Abbey. After the Norman Conquest of 1066 the manor continued as a royal possession, in the demesne of King William the Conqueror. In the Domesday Book of 1086 (Exon Version) it is recorded as held at farm by Baldwin the Sheriff, Sheriff of Devon, whose fiefdom of 176 landholdings as recorded in Domesday Book was the largest in Devon. As recorded in the Domesday Book one virgate of land had been administratively transferred from the manor of Braunton to the tenure of Robert de Pont Chardon, lord of the manor adjoining of Heanton Punchardon. The royal manor was eventually split into three parts:

==== Braunton Dean ====
Braunton Dean, which probably represented the land granted by King William the Conqueror to Algar the Priest at some time before the compilation of the Domesday Book of 1086. Together with the Rectory of Braunton, it shortly afterwards came into the possession of the Dean of Exeter. In 1810 it was held, as a tenant of the Dean and Chapter, by Charles Trelwany of Coldrenick in Cornwall.

==== Braunton Abbots ====
Braunton Abbots, which extended also over part of the adjoining parish of Marwood. It was created by a grant from the remnant of the royal manor of Braunton by King Henry III (1216–1272) to Cleeve Abbey in Somerset. In 1810 it belonged to William Courtenay, 9th Earl of Devon (1768–1835) of Powderham

==== Braunton Gorges ====
Braunton Gorges, was held by the de Sachville family. Robert de Sachville (Latinized to de Siccavilla ("from the dry town")) had been granted this part in 1202. Their successors were the Gorges family of Wraxall, Somerset. As is recorded in a surviving document, in 1324 Eleanor Ferre, wife of Ralph de Gorges (d.1323), Baron Gorges, Sheriff of Devon, and daughter of Sir John Ferre of Tothill, Lincolnshire, was granted lands at Braunton including 1 acre at 'La Crofta', two acres at 'Myddelforlong', and half an acre at 'Longeland', which names (if not spellings) are still in use today. In 1330 as is recorded in the Calendar of Fine Rolls:

Waleys, by a fine levied at Westminster in the octave of Michaelmas, 4 Edward III, granted to Ralph Gorges two-thirds of the manor of Braunton Gorges by the name of two-thirds of 3 messuages, 2 carucates of land and 100s. of rent in the same town of Braunton, together with the reversion of the third part thereof which John Pecche and Eleanor, his wife, both now deceased, held as dower of the said Eleanor of the inheritance of the aforesaid Walter, to hold the same to himself and the heirs male of his body, with remainder in default of such heirs to William son of Theobald Russell and the heirs male of his body, and remainder in default of such heirs to Theobald brother of the said William and the heirs male of his body, and that the said Ralph and William died without heirs male of their bodies, and that Theobald brother of William entered the premises by virtue of the said fine, took to wife Agnes late the wife of Theobald Gorges, " chivaler," had issue by her Bartholomew Gorges and Thomas Gorges, and died seised of the premises, after whose death the said Bartholomew entered the manor as his son and heir male, and died seised of the two-thirds aforesaid without leaving an heir male of his body, so that the two-thirds and reversion ought to remain to the said Thomas, who is of full age, as brother and heir male of Bartholomew, and that the manor is held of the king by the service of rendering to the king a barbed arrow whenever he hunts in the Forest of Exemore, "to take the fealty of the said Thomas, and cause him to have full seisin of the said two-thirds and reversion".

Sir Theobald de Gorges (d. 1381) died seized of this estate and was succeeded by his son Ralph de Gorges, succeeded by his son Bartholomew de Gorges. In 1810 it was owned, together with Ash, Fullabrook and Braunton Park, by Joseph Davie Basset (1764–1846), later of Watermouth Castle, near Lynmouth, son of John Davie of Orleigh Court, near Bideford, by his wife Eleanora Basset, sister and heiress of Francis Basset (c. 1740–1802) of Heanton Punchardon and Umberleigh. In accordance with the terms of the inheritance, as was then usual in such cases, Joseph Davie and his descendants adopted the arms and surname of Basset in lieu of their patronymic.

=== St Brannock's Church ===
The grade I listed parish church, dedicated to St. Brannock, is large and has a Norman tower topped by a spire. A fine series of richly carved 16th century bench-ends survive with other interesting carved woodwork. The building is almost entirely 15th century, excepting the 13th century chancel with its arch and three lancet windows. The advowson of the parish church was historically a possession of Exeter Cathedral ("St Mary and St Peter").

==== Monuments and furnishings ====
In the floor of the choir is an unusual monumental brass which is a palimpsest, i.e. it has been re-used. It depicts on its uppermost side Elizabeth Bourchier (d.1548), a daughter of John Bourchier, 1st Earl of Bath of Tawstock Court, feudal baron of Bampton, Devon, and the wife of Edward Chichester (d.1522) of Raleigh in the nearby parish of Pilton. Her husband inherited the estate of Saunton, in the parish of Braunton, from his mother Margaret Beaumont, daughter and heiress of Hugh Beaumont of Shirwell, and her 3rd son Philip Chichester was seated at Saunton, where his mother may have spent her widowhood. Alternatively she may have lived at Ash, in the parish of Braunton, which in the 16th century the Bourchiers purchased from the Bellew family, whilst the Bourchiers also owned the estate of Beare in the parish of Braunton. A 16th-century wooden chest survives, with engravings of Portuguese men who may have come to England with the Spanish Armada of 1588.

==== St. Brannock ====
In 550, the missionary St. Brannock sailed from South Wales and converted the native Britons to Christianity. Brannock was a priest in the household of Brychan, King of Brecknock. He married one of the king's daughters, but due to family troubles left his royal home. At that time the Welsh Britons often raided their Dumnonian neighbours in North Devon, on the south side of the Bristol Channel.

Brannock probably came to North Devon with one such raid and is said to have landed at Saunton Sands, then dense woodland before later wind-erosion into sand-dunes, at the mouth of the River Taw. Brannock settled among a tribe of local Britons and soon established a strong Christian community. A church, the first in North Devon, was built near where the Caen Stream began to spread its waters on the alluvial lands around the River Taw. Brannockstood, the township that grew up around this church, later became Brantone and at the end of the 19th century, Braunton.

The story has it that Brannock tried to build the church on the hill overlooking the settlement but it kept being damaged by the weather and in a dream he saw a pigsty with piglets. At the foot of the hill he built the current church over the sty where it still remains, and the central wooden boss in the church depicts a sow and piglets. The remains of the original church remain on the hill.

== Demography ==
The population of Braunton, according to the census of 1801, was 1,296. This number increased quite rapidly in the thirty years to 1831, to 2,047 however the rate of increase slowed during the next 10 years and coinciding with the arrival of the railway fell from 2,364 in 1851 to 2,089 in 1881. Population growth resumed and saw almost a doubling between 1961 and 2011, to 8,128 people. Data for 1801–1961 is available at Britain Through Time. The 2001 and 2011 Censuses give detailed information about the village. The settlement's population in 2011 were living in 3,552 households.

Population of Braunton
Year	1801	1811	1821	1831	1841	1851	1881	1891	1901
Population	1,296	1,390	1,699	2,047	2,274	2,364	2,089	2,171	2,135
Year	1911	1921	1931	1941	1951	1961	2001	2011	2021
Population	2,328	2,644	3,019	n/a	3,819	4,303	7,510	8,128	10,217

== Historic estates ==
Several of the historic estates within the parish of Braunton have expanded into larger settlements. They include:

=== Saunton ===
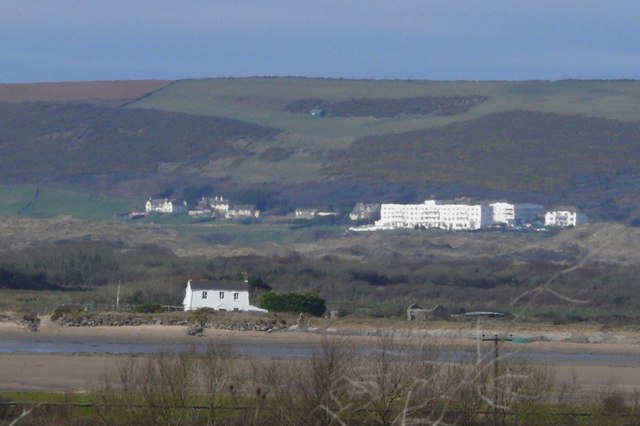
The Saunton Sands Hotel

The civil parish includes the linear, hill-foot coastal settlement of Saunton, chiefly with holiday homes a small holiday village and a stand-alone luxury hotel with private beach areas.

=== Knowle ===
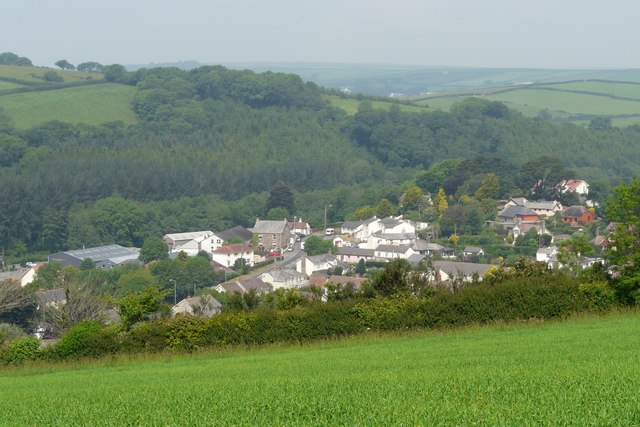
Knowle

Higher above the village is Knowle commencing within 1 mile (1.6 km) to the northwest.

=== Wrafton ===
Wrafton almost adjoins to the south and some of its affinity, particularly economic, is with Braunton instead of its civil parish, Heanton Punchardon further along the straight, semi-coastal road towards Barnstaple.

=== Lobb and North Lobb ===
WNW of the village centre is a modest farm, Fairlynch, followed by a farm-courtyard cluster of buildings, Lobb and then north, by three springs in a cleft (lowland half-bowl) of the Saunton Down upland ridge is a similar cluster, North Lobb with no road access from these places other than to Braunton but a footpath (Milkaway Lane) to Croyde and a similarly downhill branch to the south, Hannaborrow Lane to Saunton Sands.

=== Fullabrook ===
Fullabrook was the home of Sir Nicholas Hooper (1654–1731), Member of Parliament for Barnstaple 1695–1715.

== Events ==
The village holds a Town carnival each year near the end of May.

== Tourism ==
There are a range of surfing shops located in Braunton.

=== Facilities ===
The town has a few hotels and guesthouses and numerous shops (including a large Supermarket) and pubs. The town also boasts a secondary school and three primary schools. It also has multiple skating areas, one with a skating bowl and the other featuring several small ramps.

=== Surfing ===
Since the closing years of the 20th century, the village has become a hub for surfing as it is on the main road gateway to three of the South West's surf beaches of Saunton, Croyde and Putsborough, all with fine powdery sand, and to a lesser extent a road to Woolacombe). The Museum of British Surfing opened in 2012 in the old goods shed of the old Braunton Railway Station on the Ilfracombe Branch Line.

A number of major surf brands are associated with the village including Tiki, Board Barn, Tokyo, Demons Of Doom Killers, Rusty Peach, Modern Foam Designs and Salt Rock.

== Transport ==
Braunton is served by the following bus services:

- 21B Ilfracombe - Braunton - Barnstaple (Stagecoach)
- 21C Georgeham / Croyde Ruda Bay - Croyde - Saunton - Braunton - Barnstaple (Stagecoach)
- 303 Woolacombe - Braunton - Barnstaple (Filers)
- 502 to London (National Express)

== Notable residents ==
- Brannoc of Braunton (6th century), a local Christian saint
- Richard Knill (1787–1857), an English missionary.
- William Scott (1825–1917), a Church of England priest, he became the colonial astronomer for New South Wales.
- Charlotte Eliza Bousfield (1828–1933), a diarist who gave an extensive insight into the world and values of a middle-class Victorian lady of staunch Methodist and temperance convictions.
- Norman Leslie Falcon (1904–1996), geologist, contributed to finding petroleum and natural gas reserves.
- Danny Barrow (born 1995), footballer who has played over 160 games, mainly abroad

== Twin towns ==
- Plouescat, France.

== See also ==
- Braunton Academy
- Braunton Burrows
- North Devon Coast AONB
- RMB Chivenor
- Saunton Sands

== Braunton gallery ==
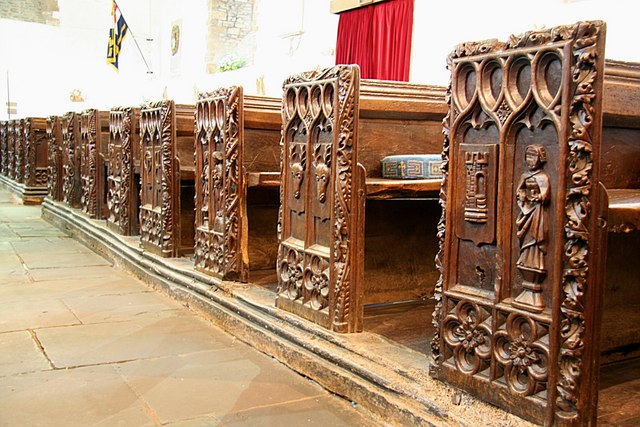
Bench Ends

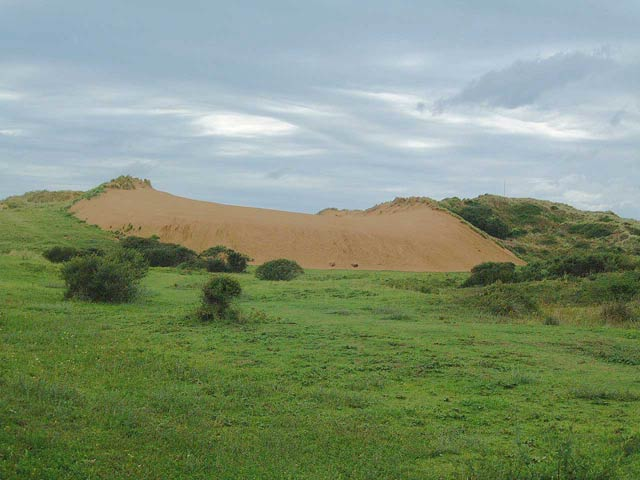
Main Blowout (geology) dune at Braunton Burrows

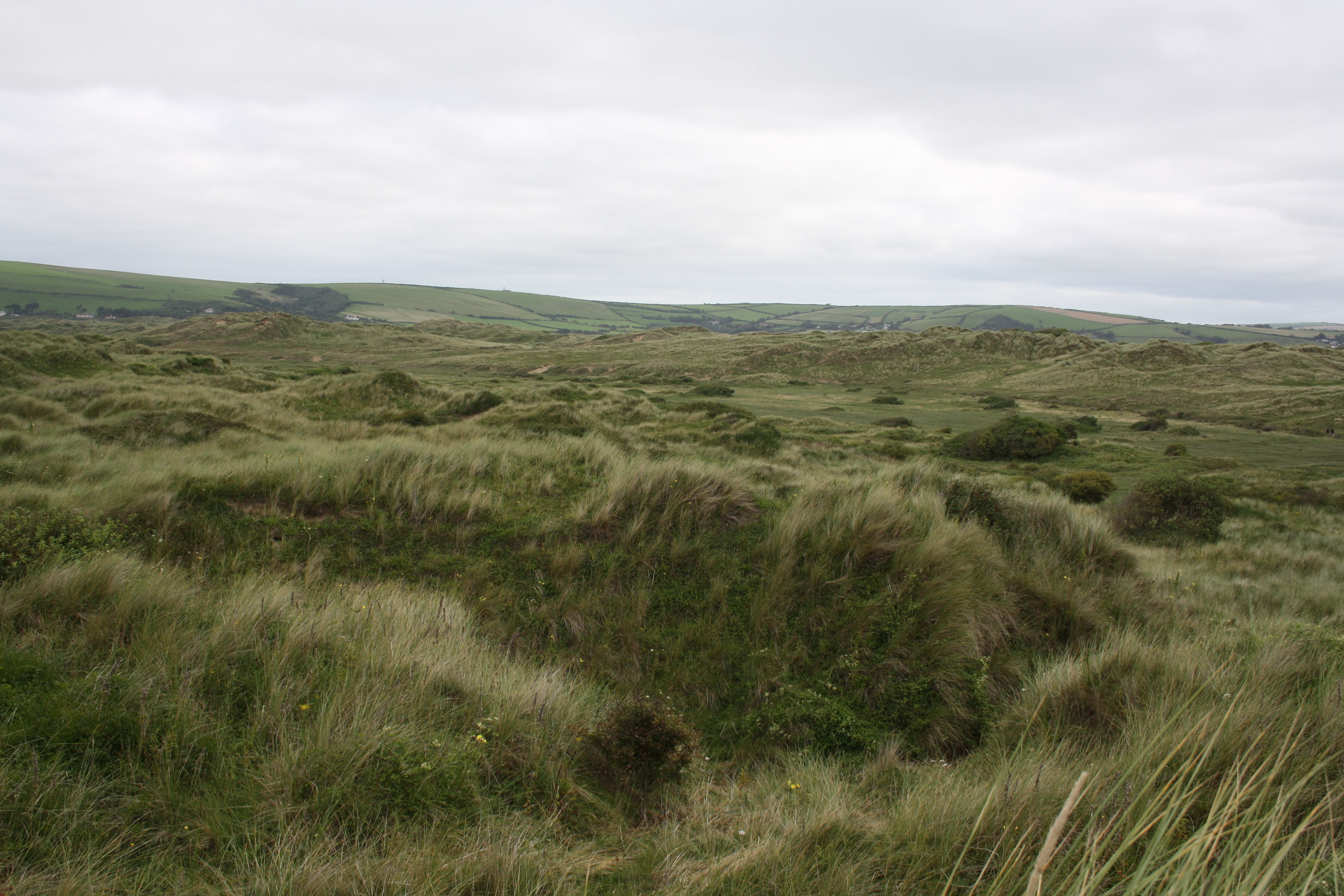
Braunton Burrows in Devon

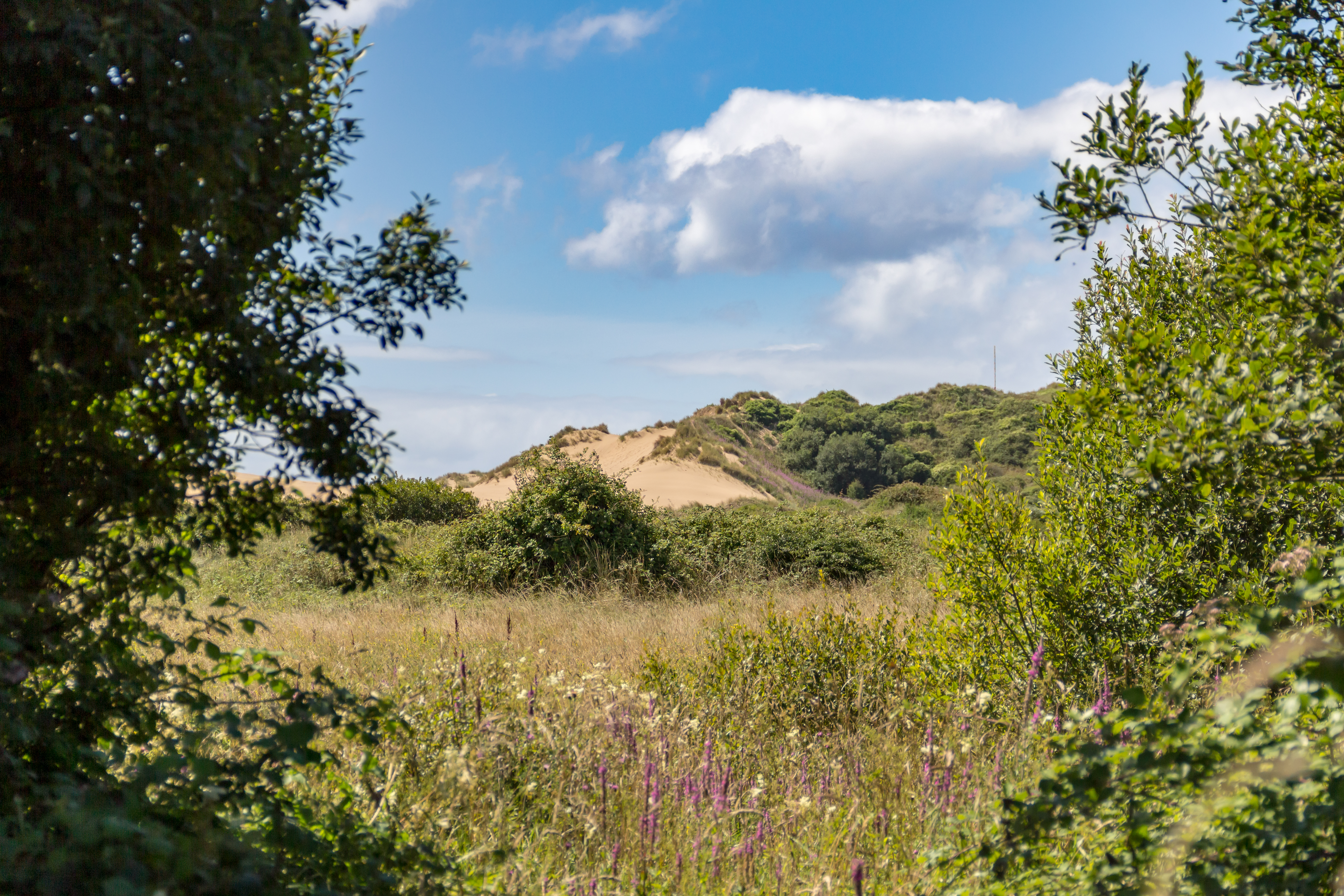
Braunton Burrows

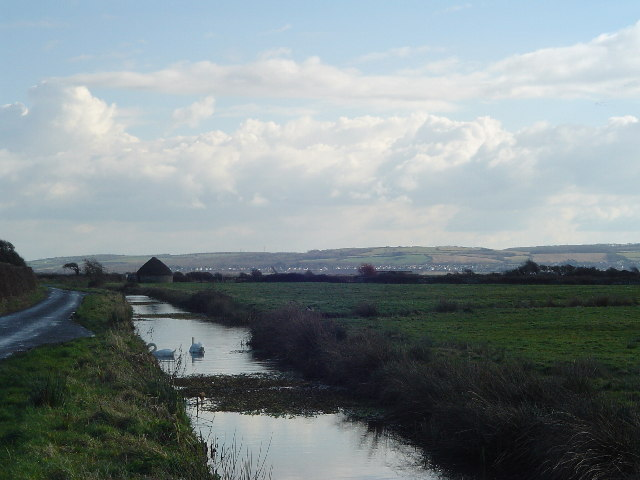
Braunton Marshes and swans. Taken from Marsh Road

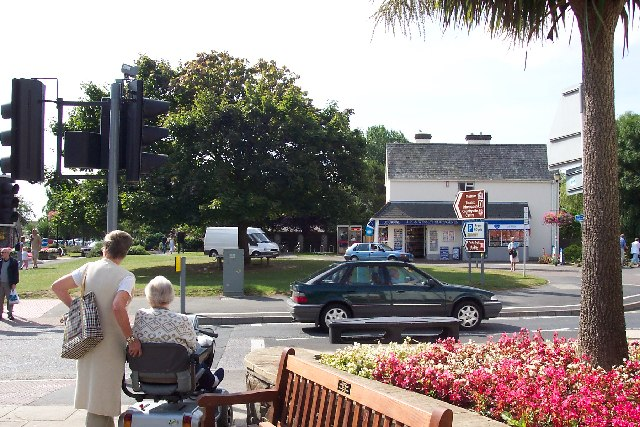
Braunton village centre (2003)

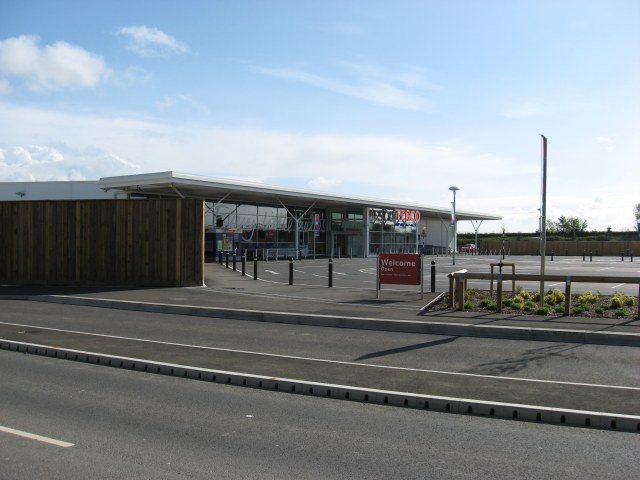
Braunton Tesco

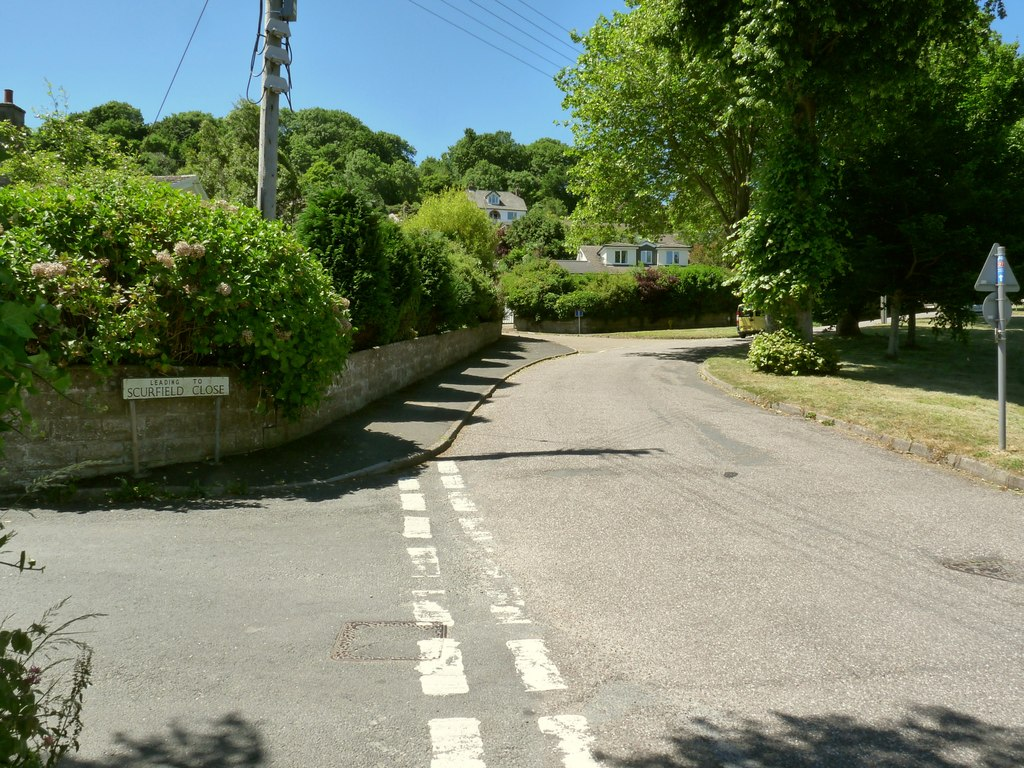
Scurfield Close leading off from the road to Georgeham

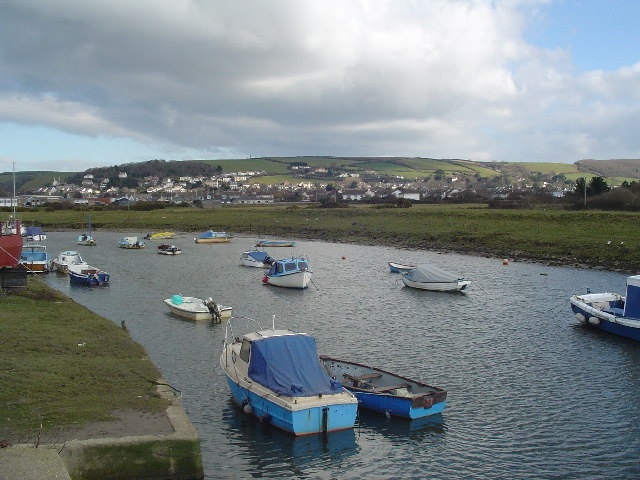
Velator Quay. looking back up the River Caen towards East Hill, Braunton

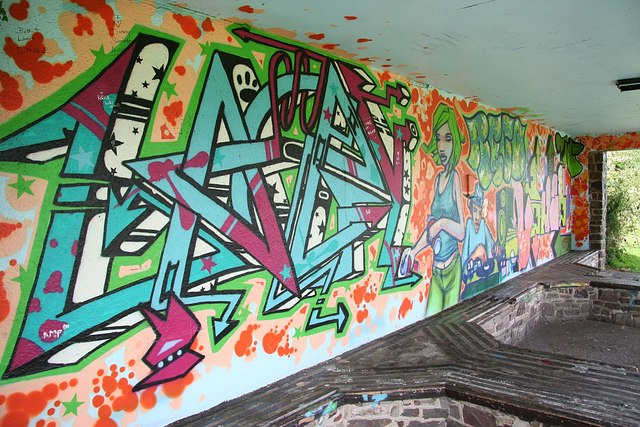
Mural at the Braunton Recreation Ground

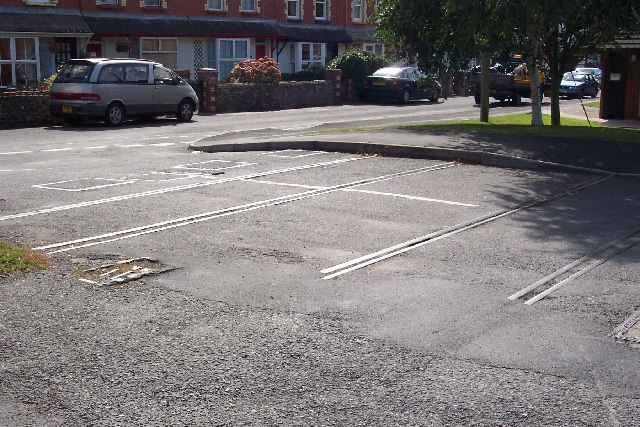
A reminder of Braunton's railway. Rails left in the road at a level crossing in Braunton

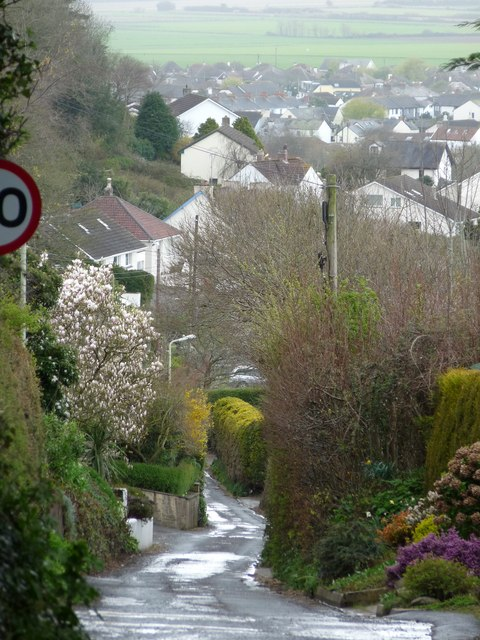
Braunton and the Great Field beyond

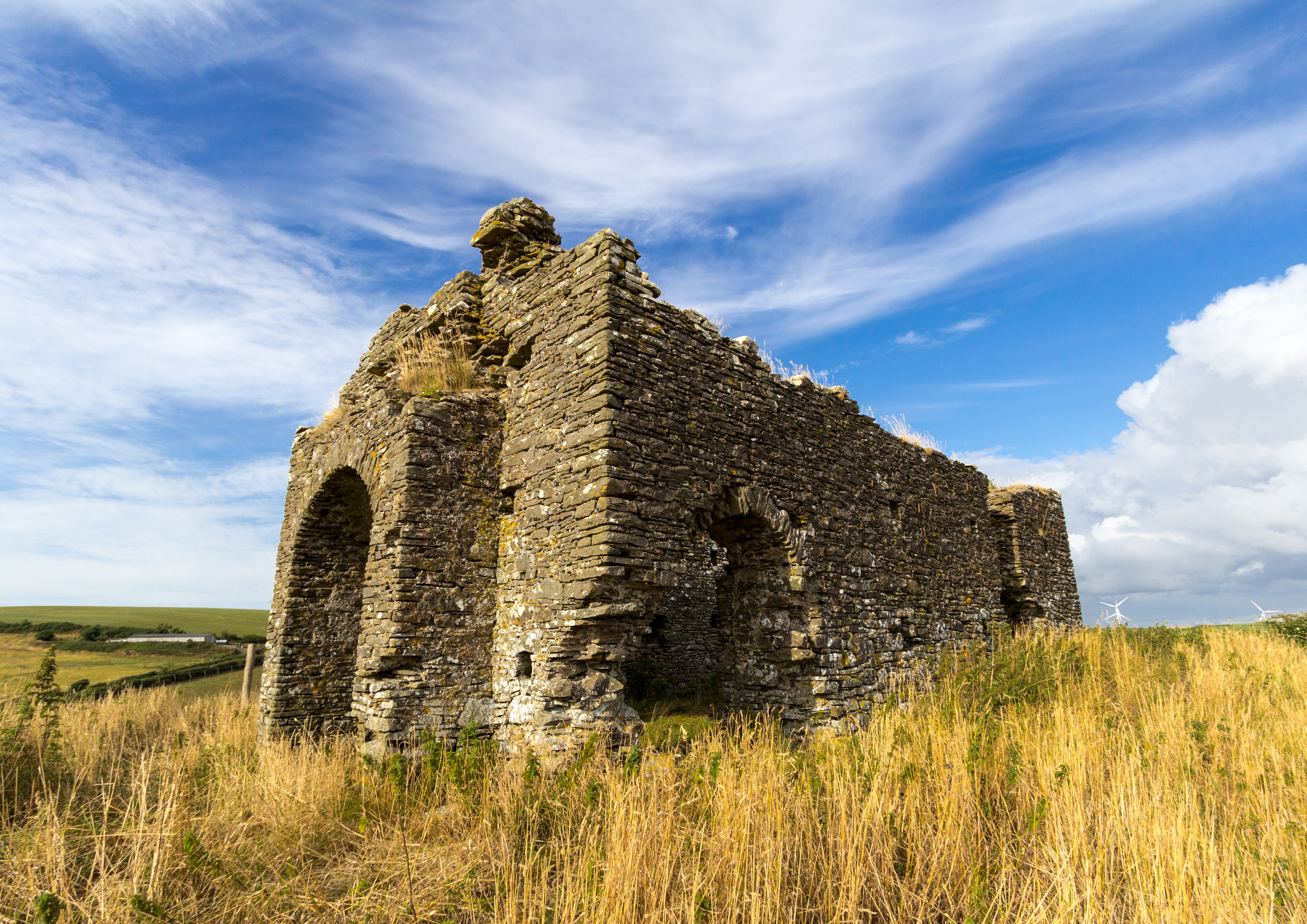
St. Michael's Chapel Ruin

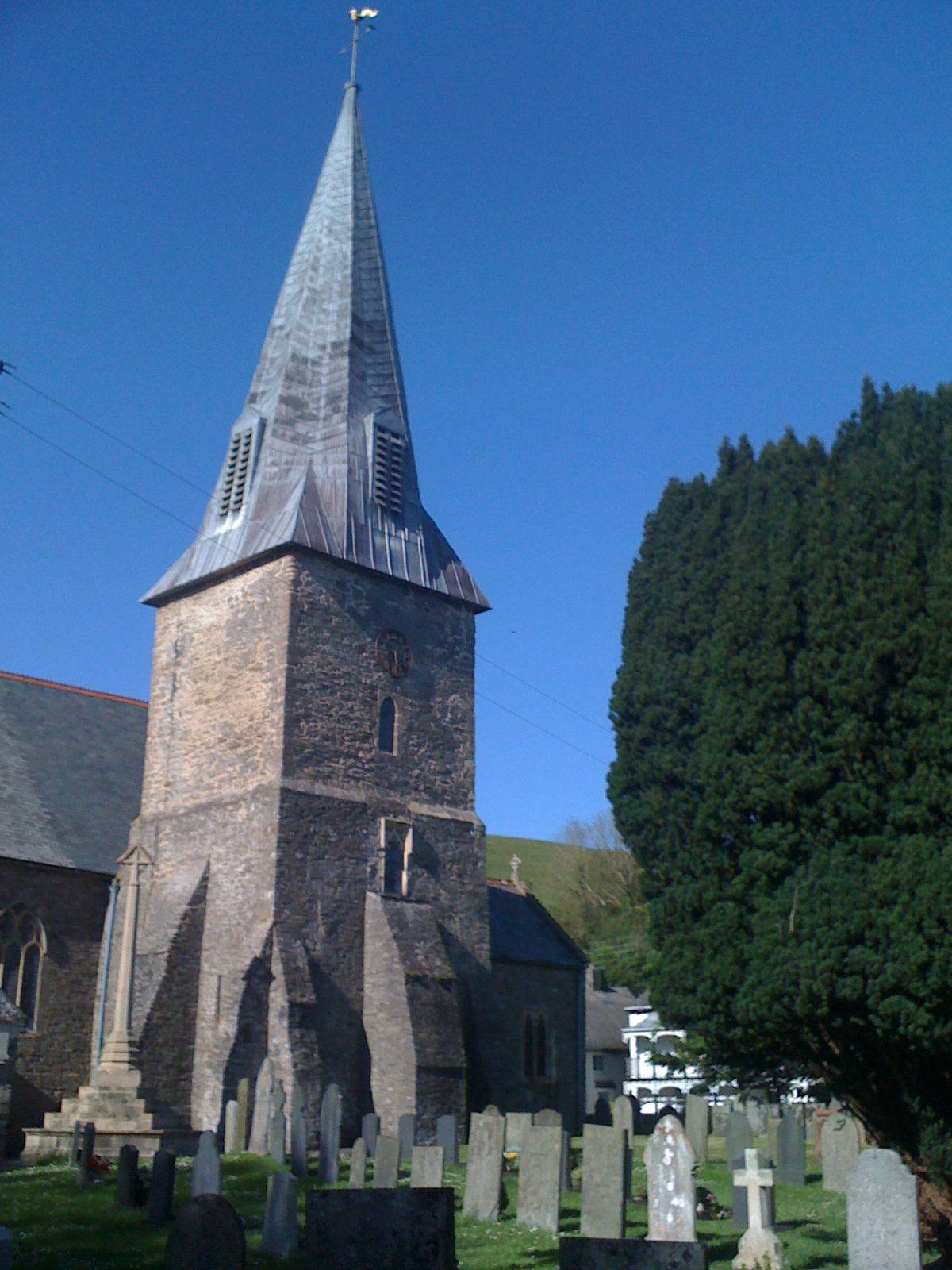
St Brannock's Church

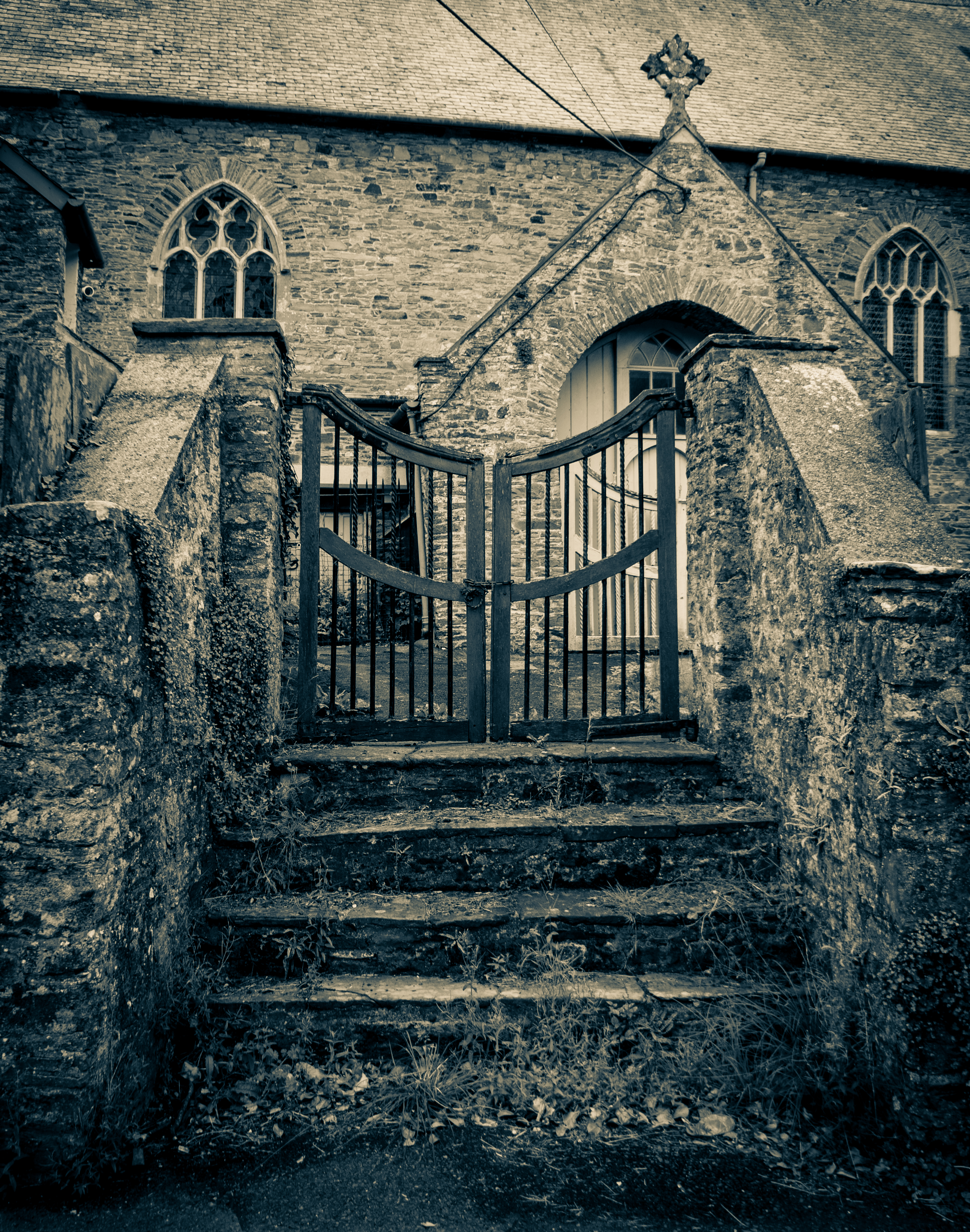
St Brannock's Church

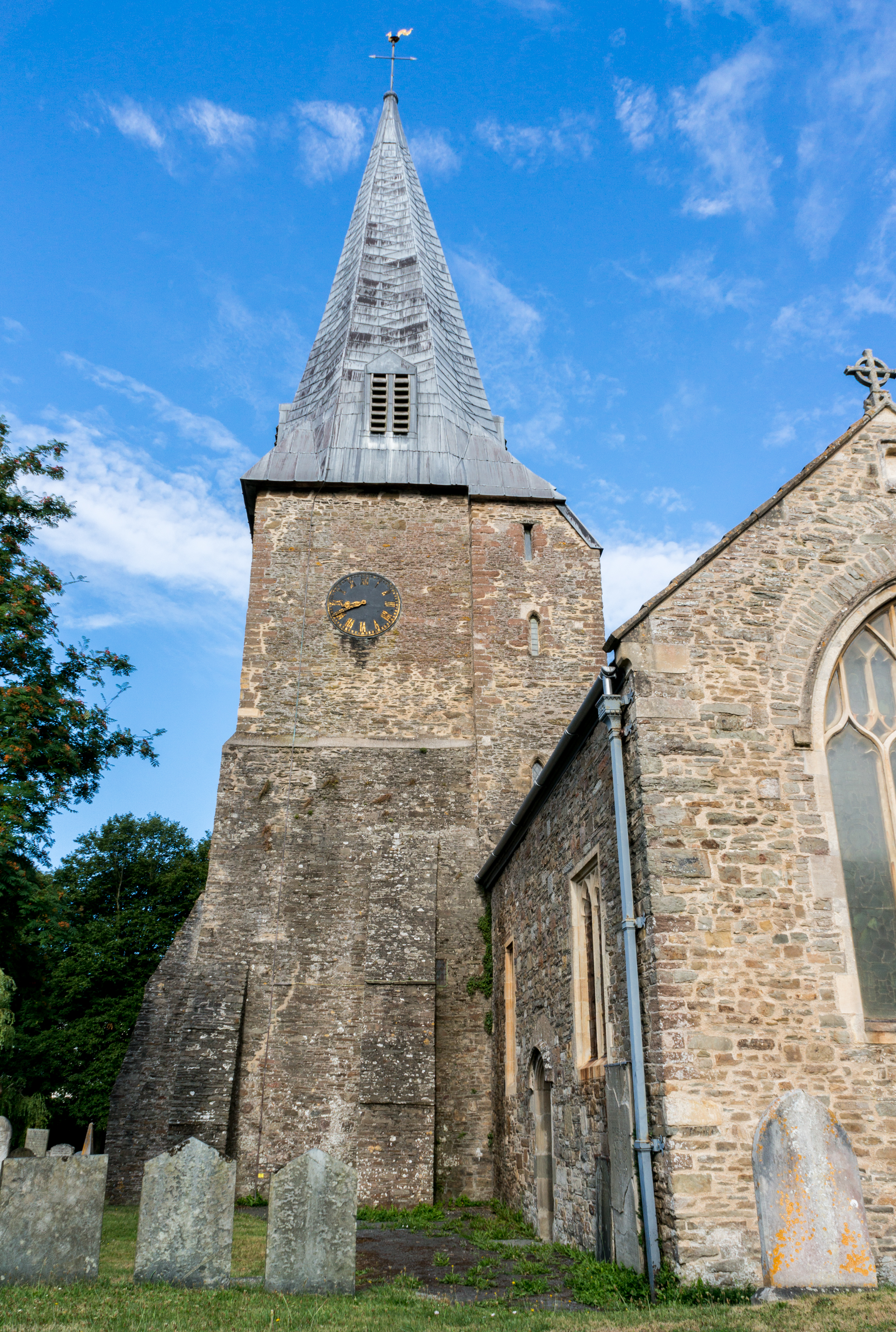
St Brannock's Church

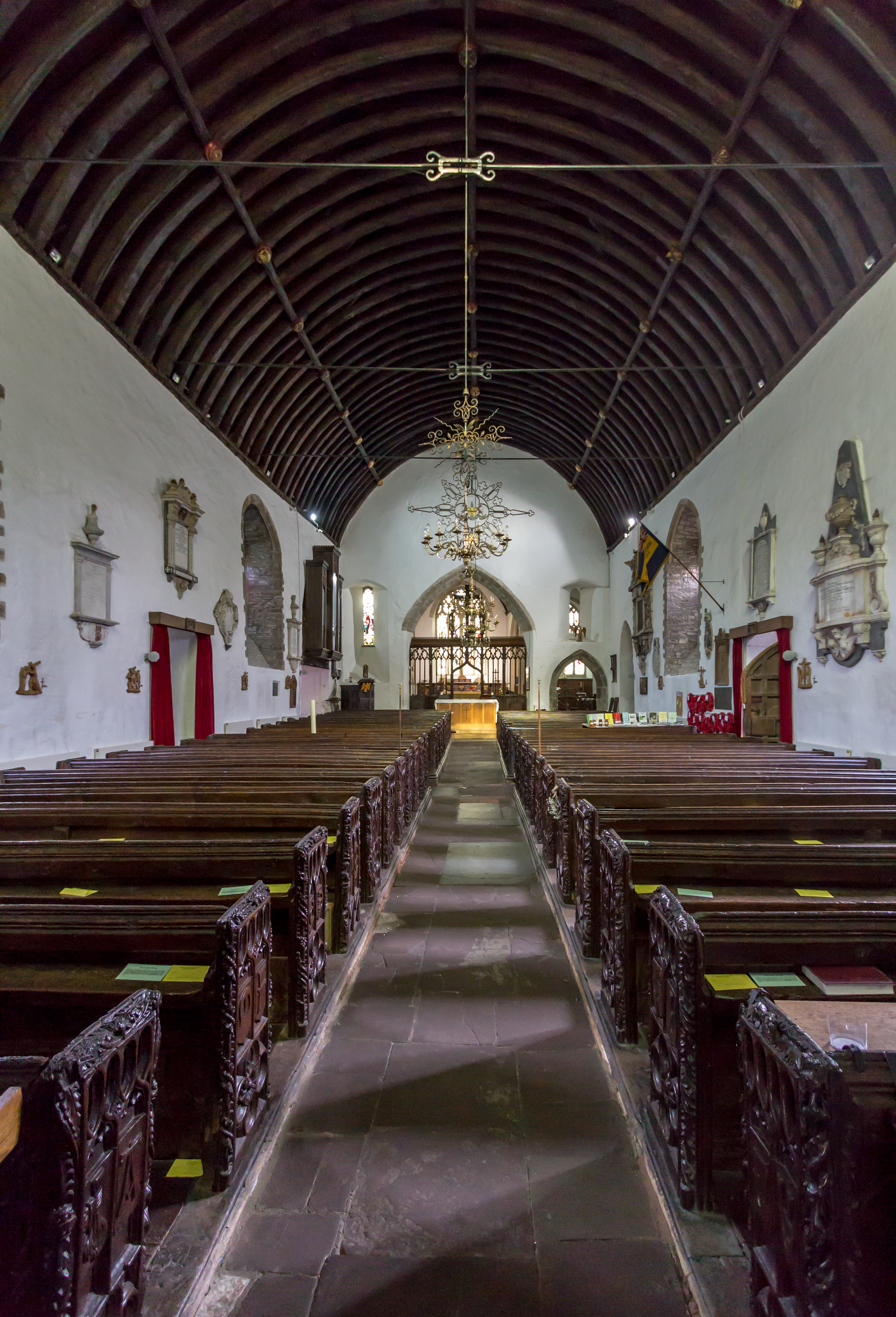
St Brannock's Church

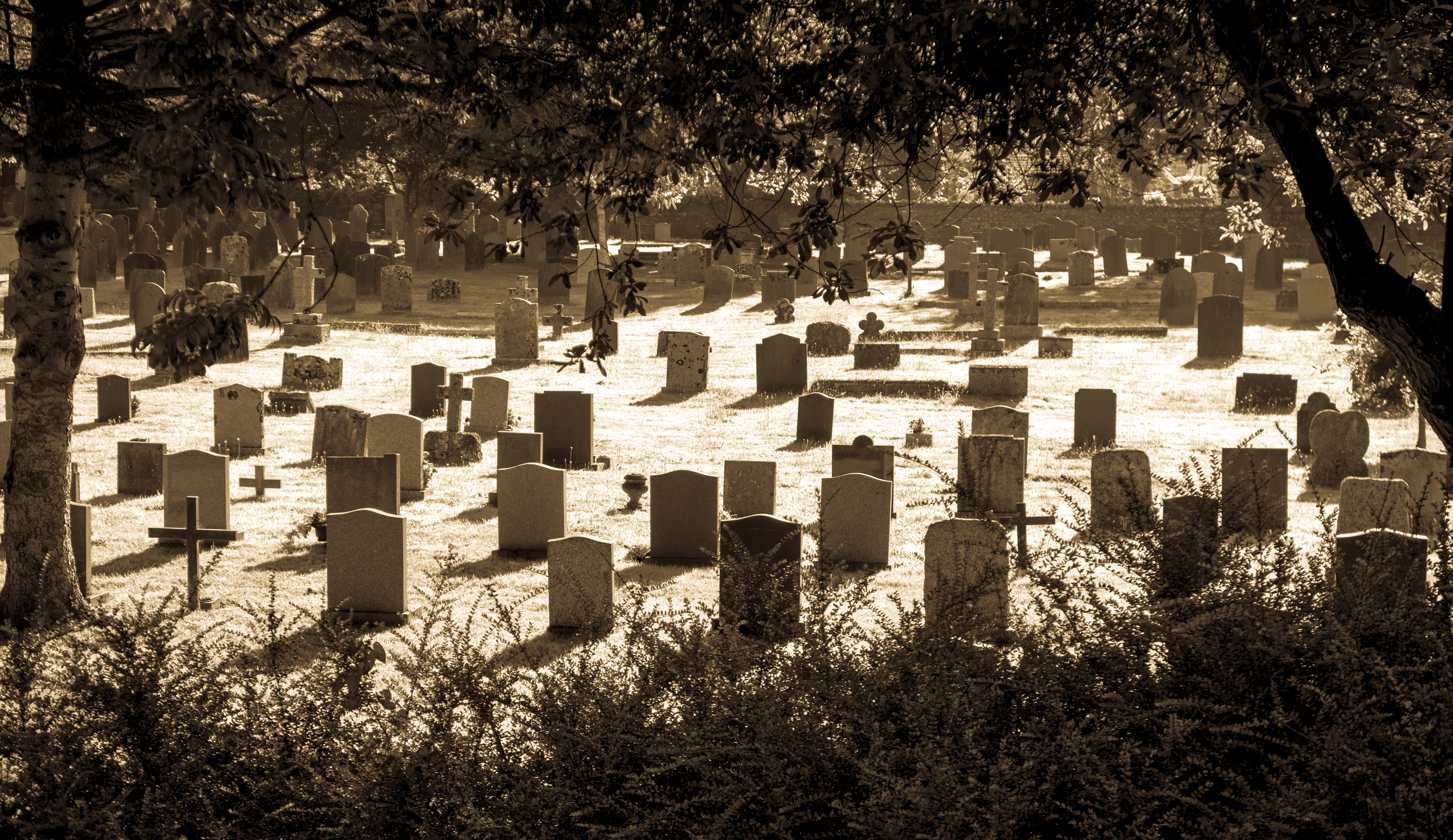
Cemetery of the St Brannock's Church

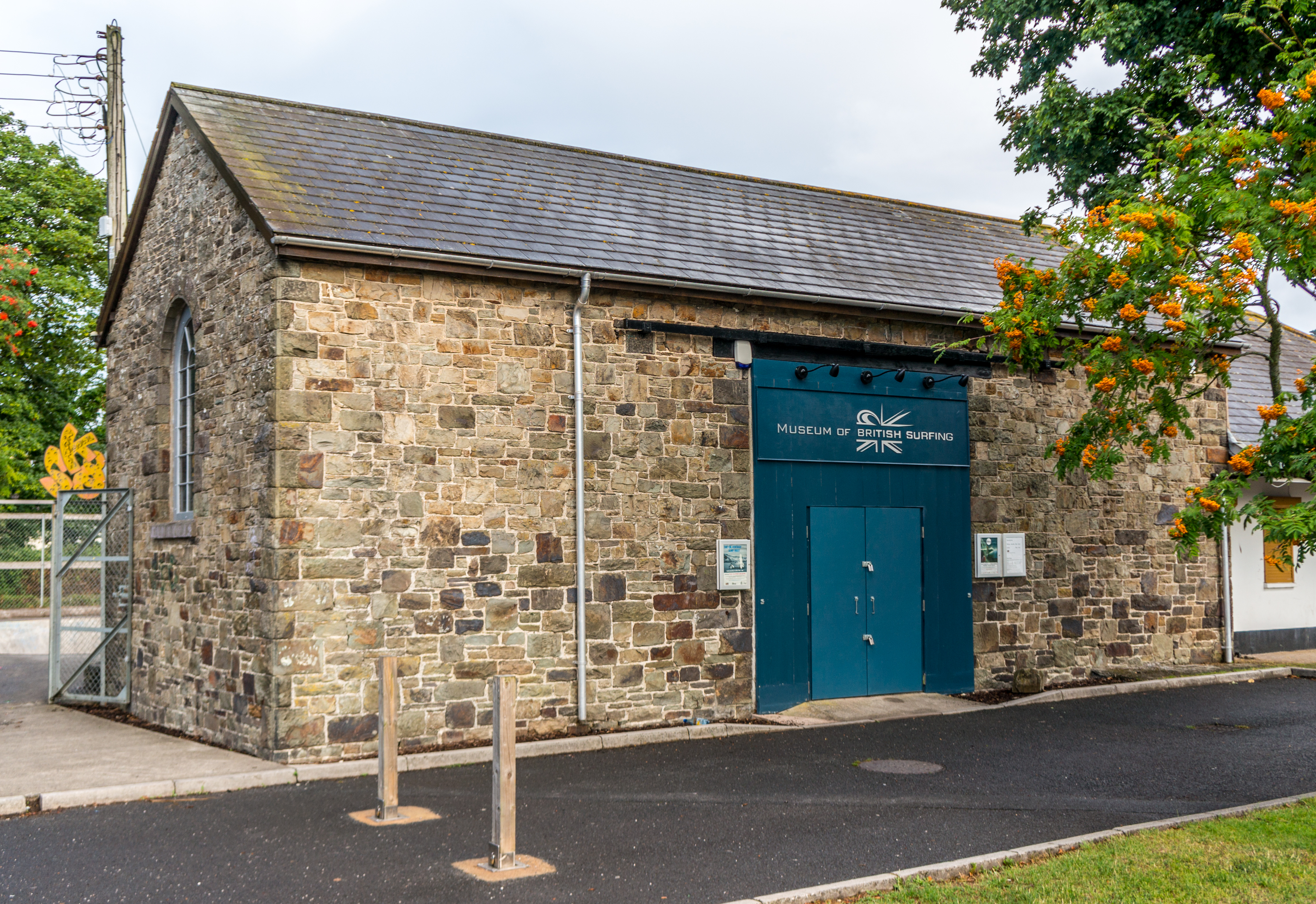
Goods Shep of the old Railway Station; today the Museum of British Surfing

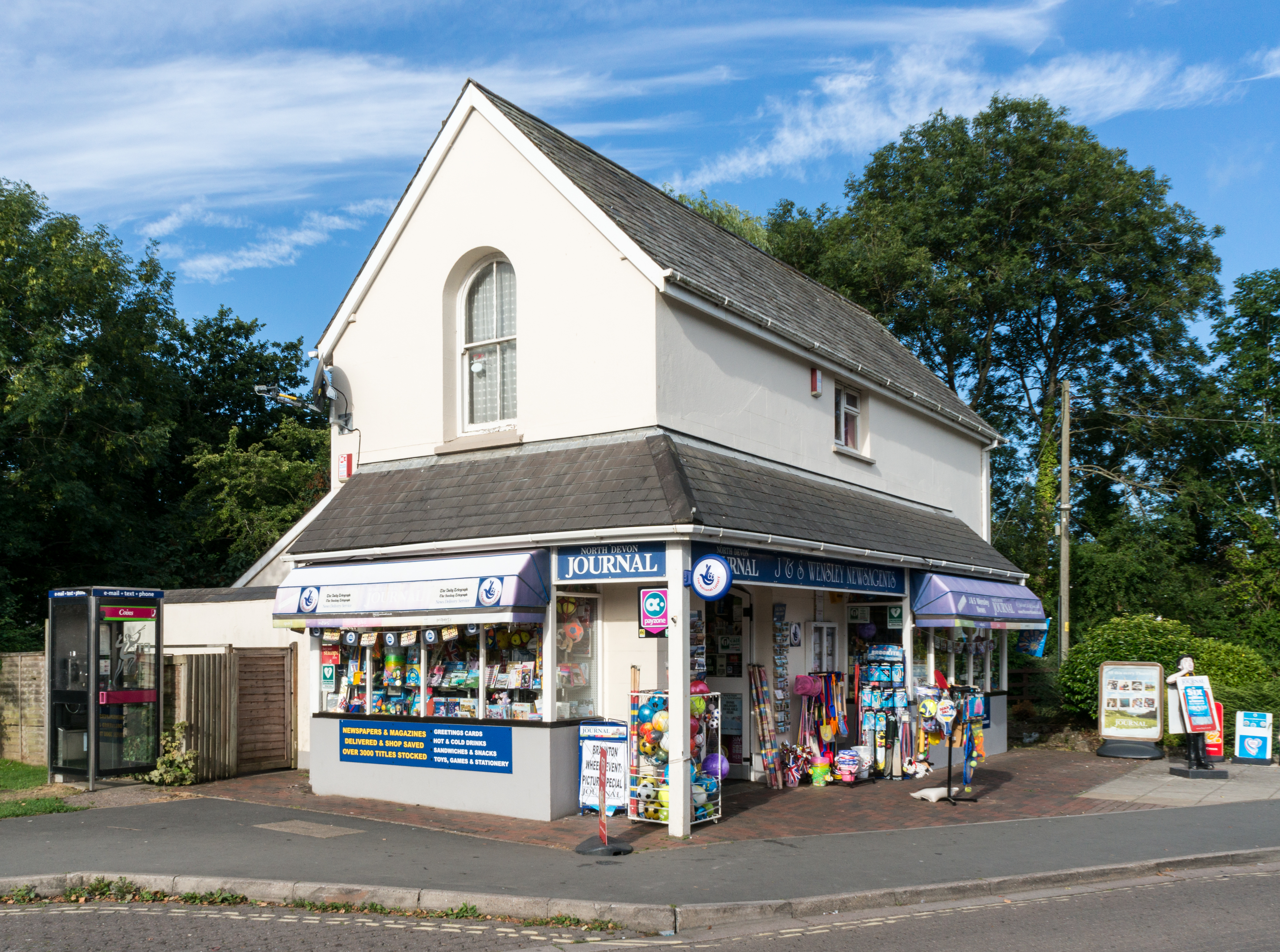
Station House of the old Railway Station

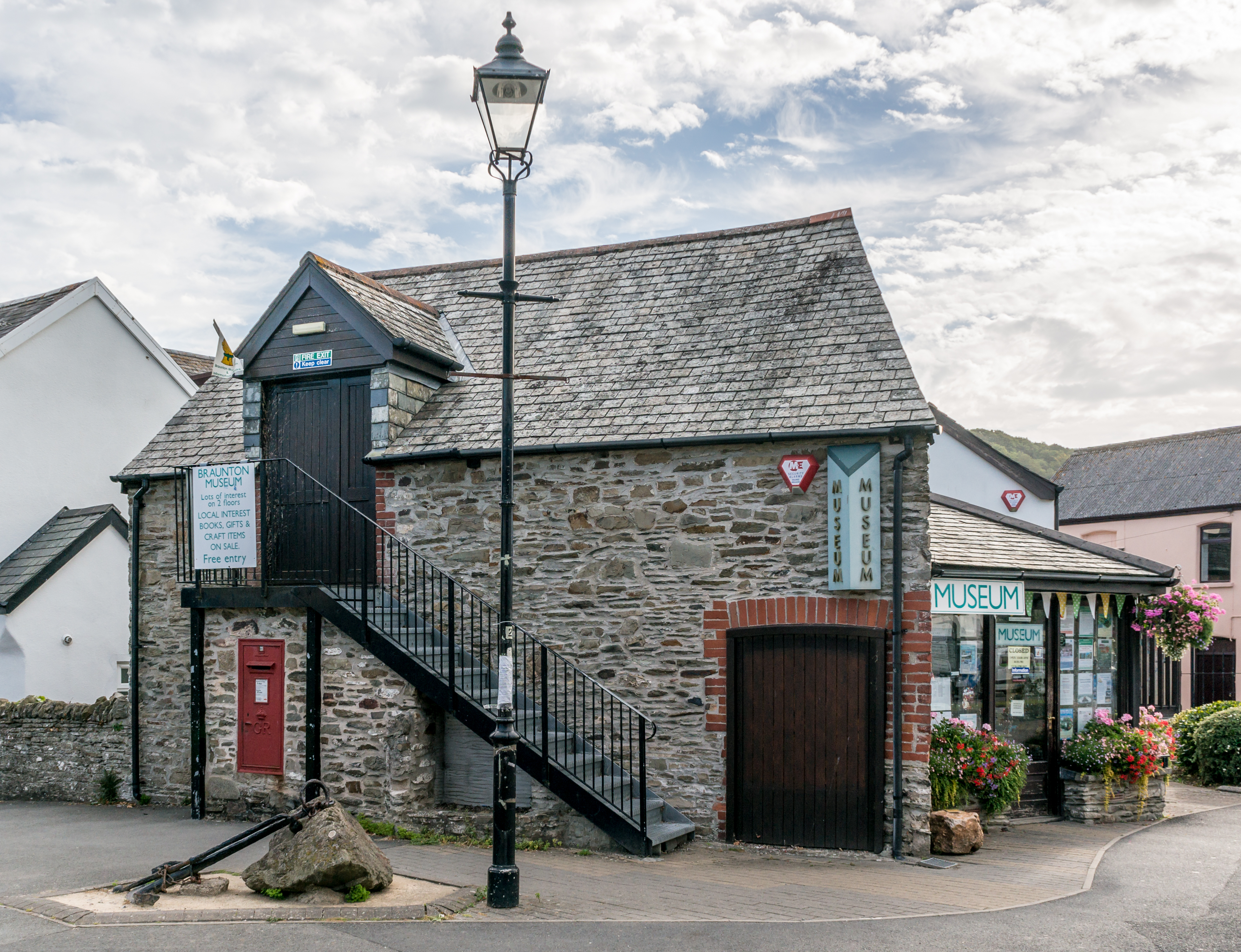
Braunton & District Museum

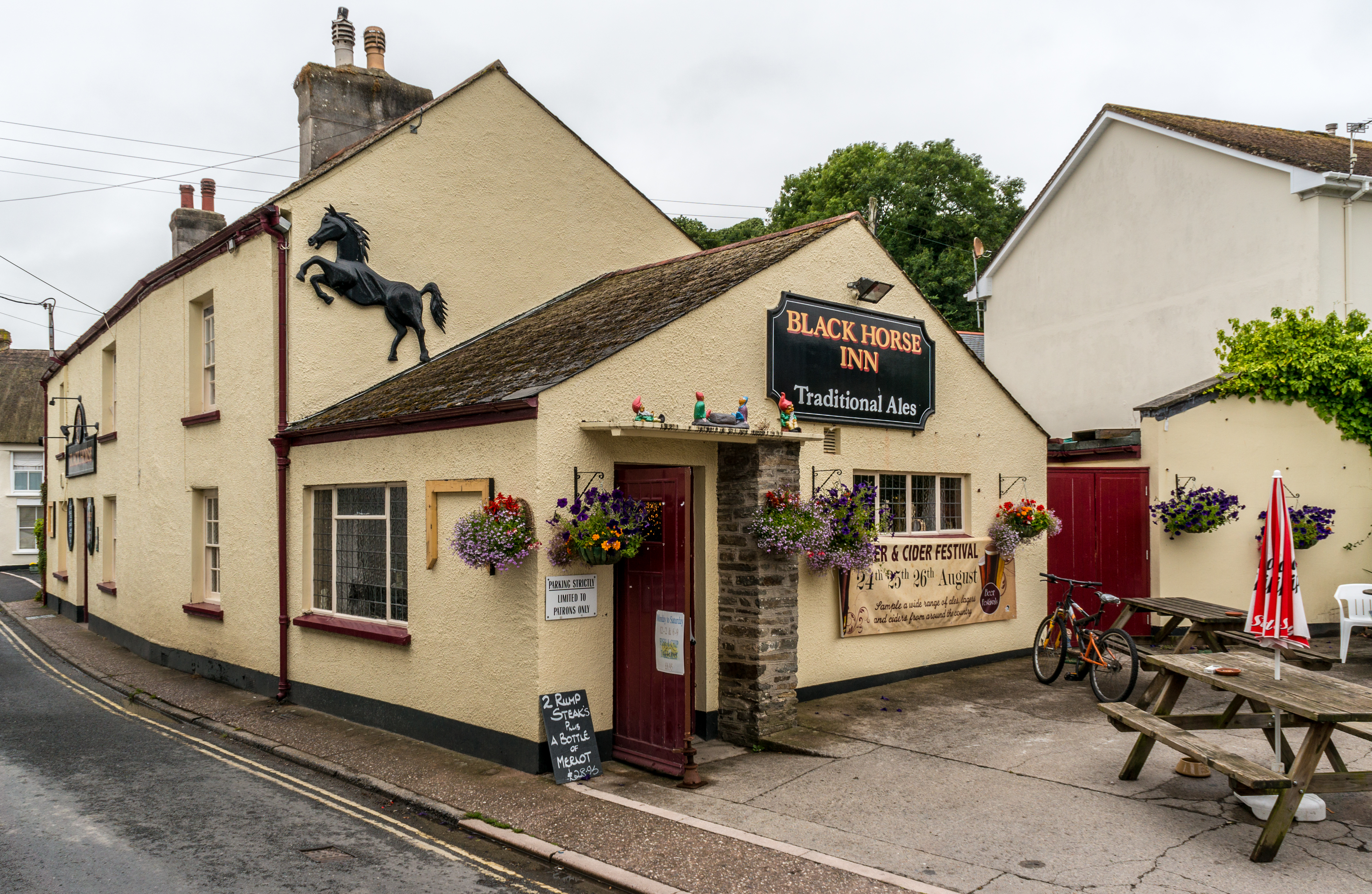
"Black Horse Inn”

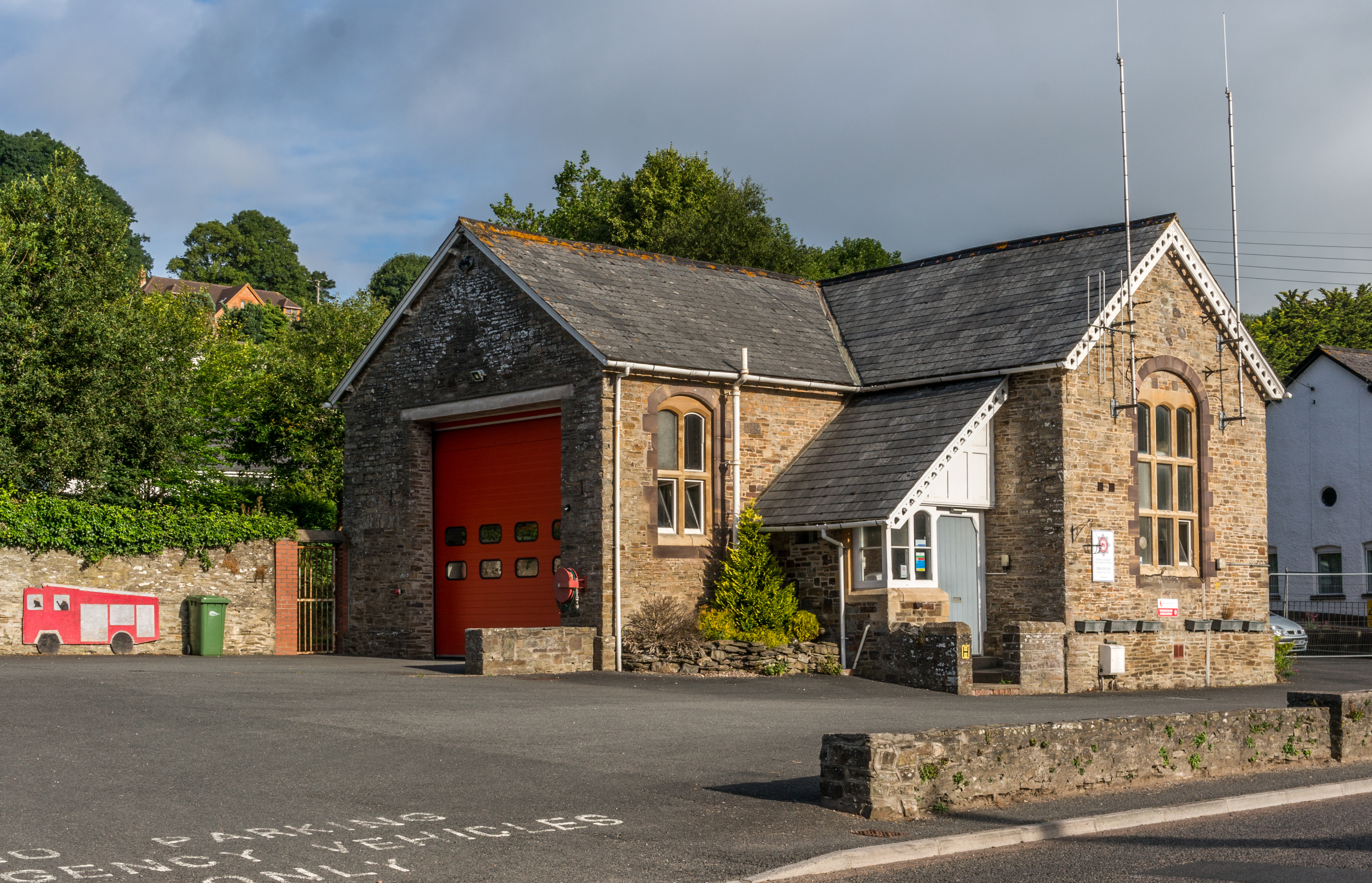
Fire Station

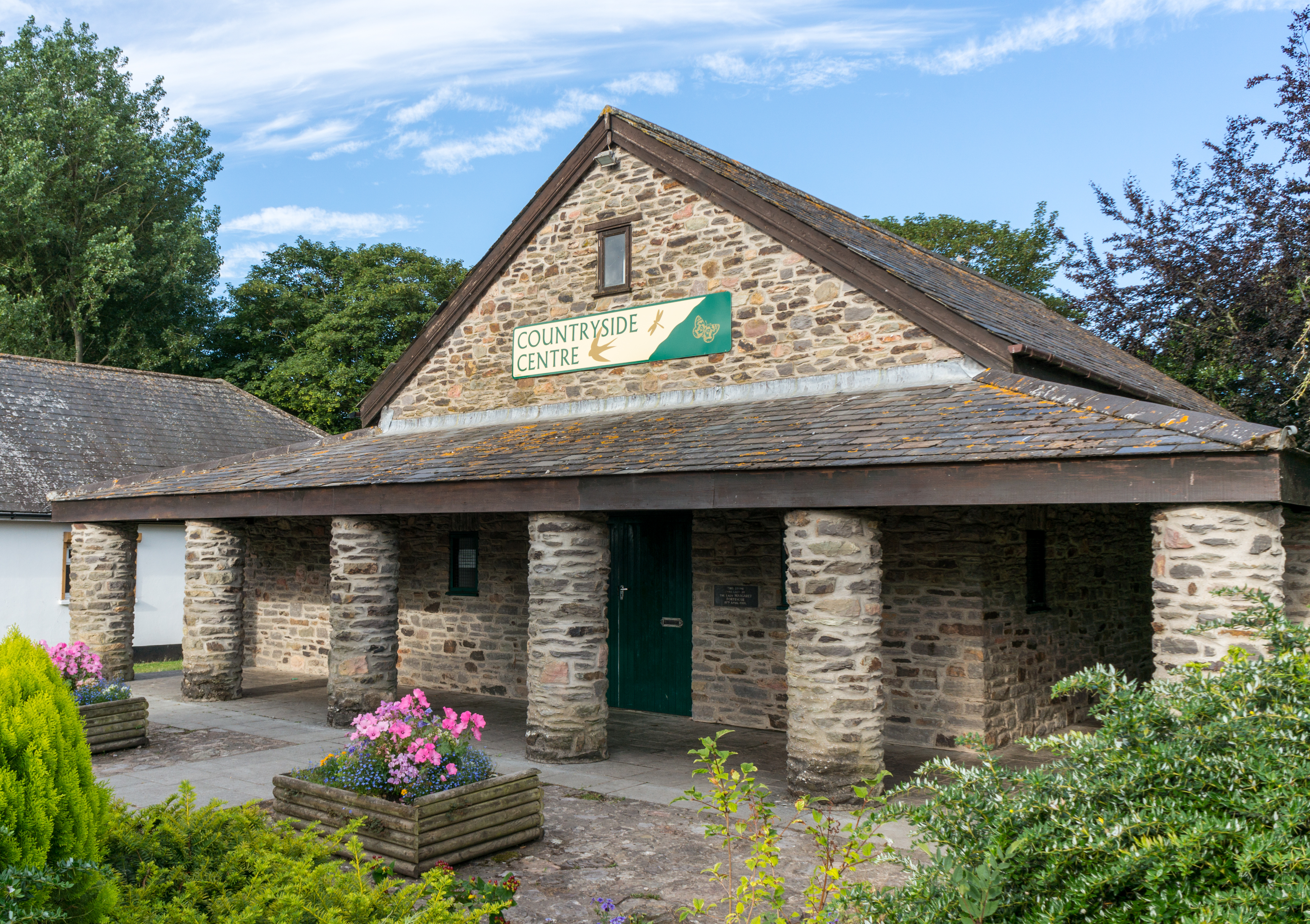
Countryside Centre

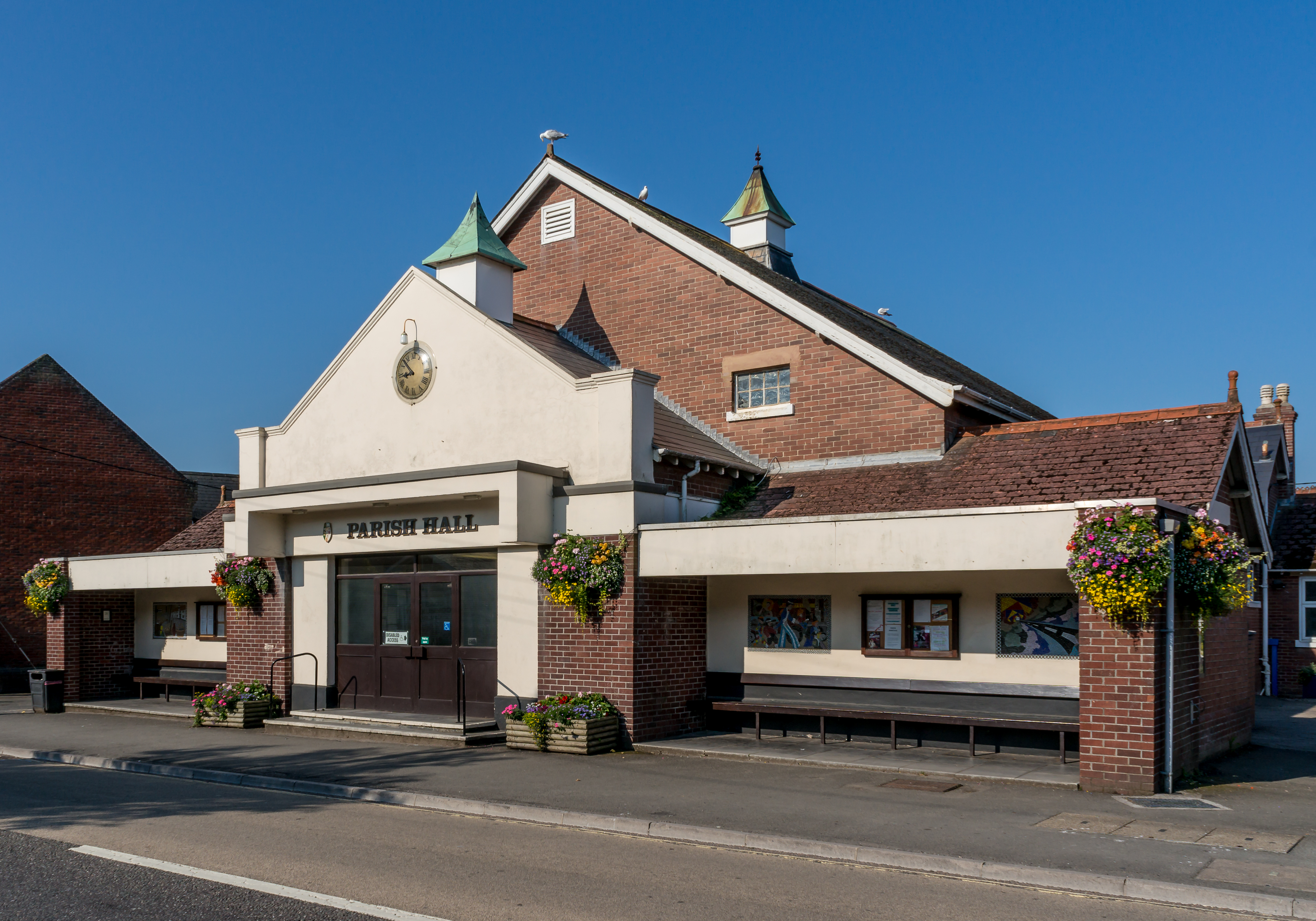
Parish Hall

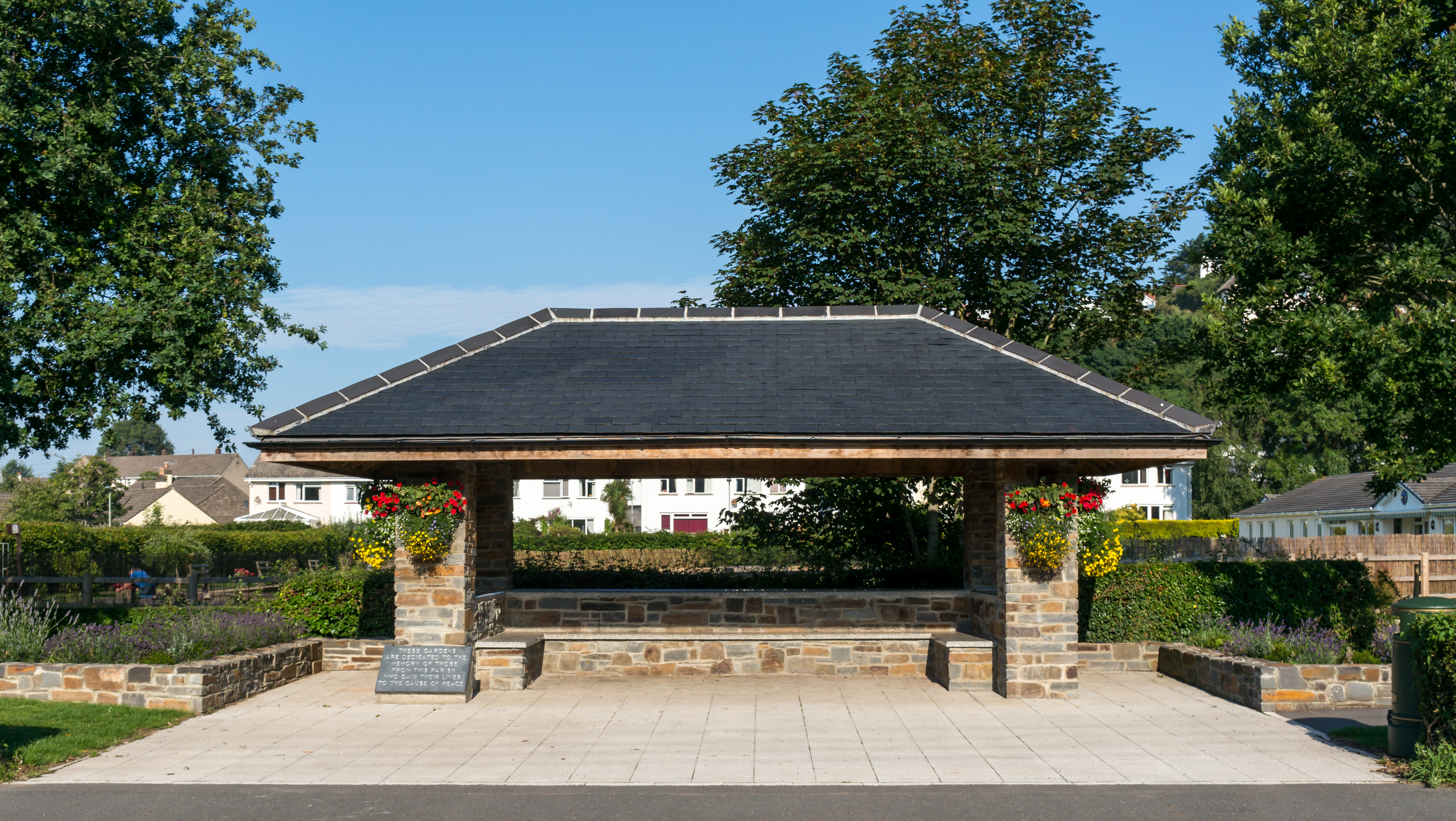
Memorial

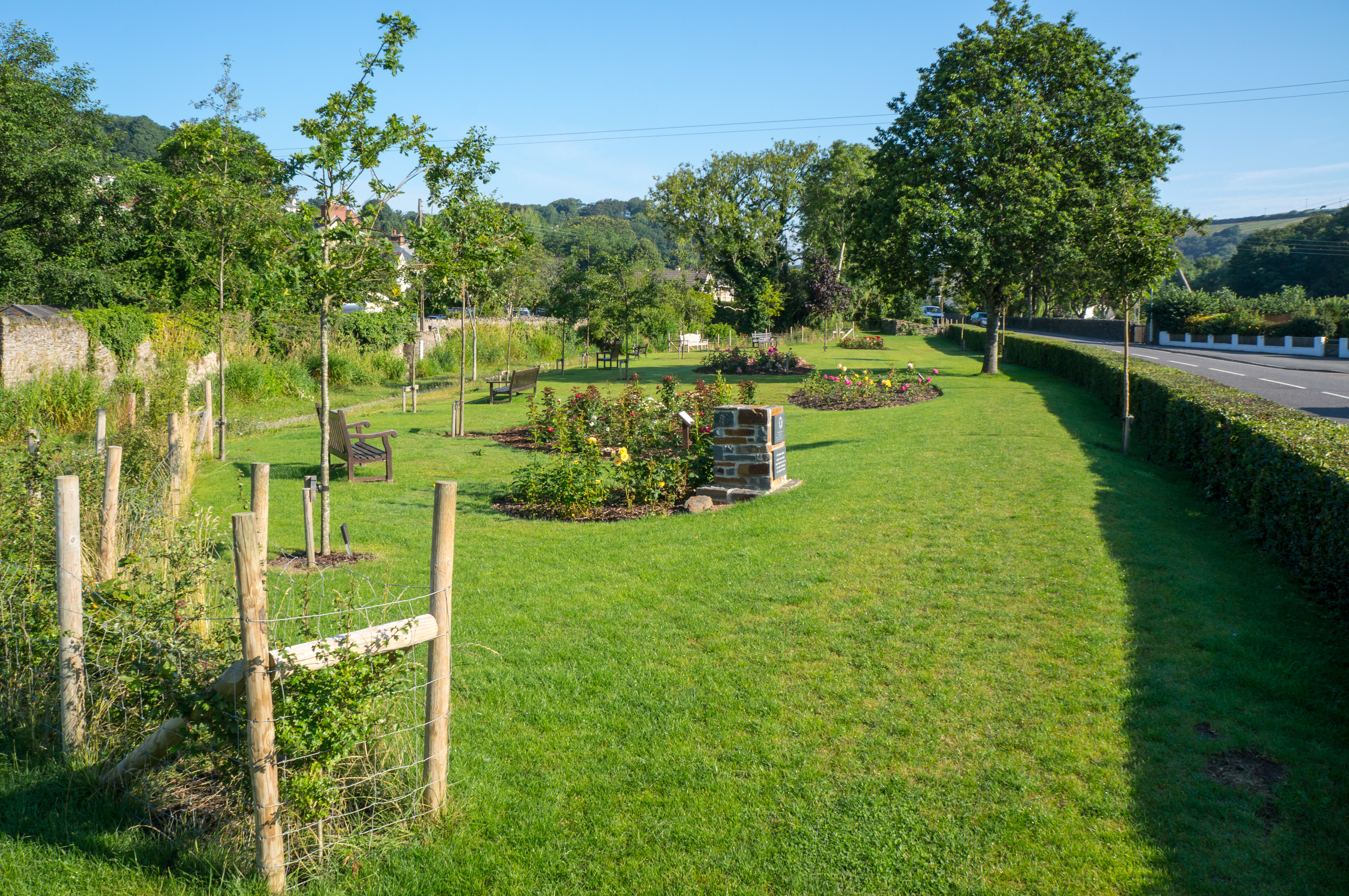
Memorial Garden

== Notes and references ==
Notes
