= Saunton Sands =

Beach in Devon, England

Coordinates: 51°06′0″N 4°13′33″W

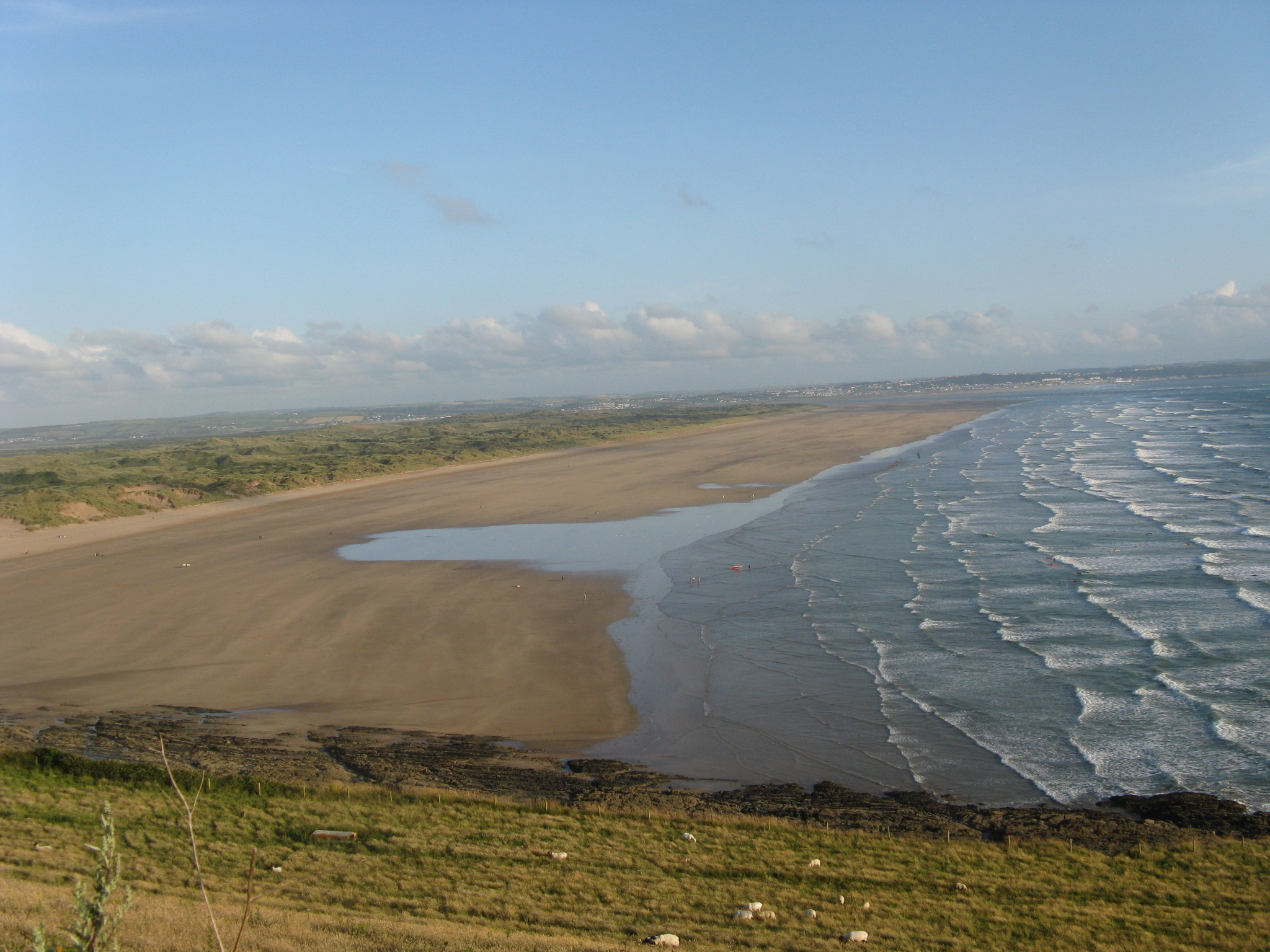
Saunton Sands

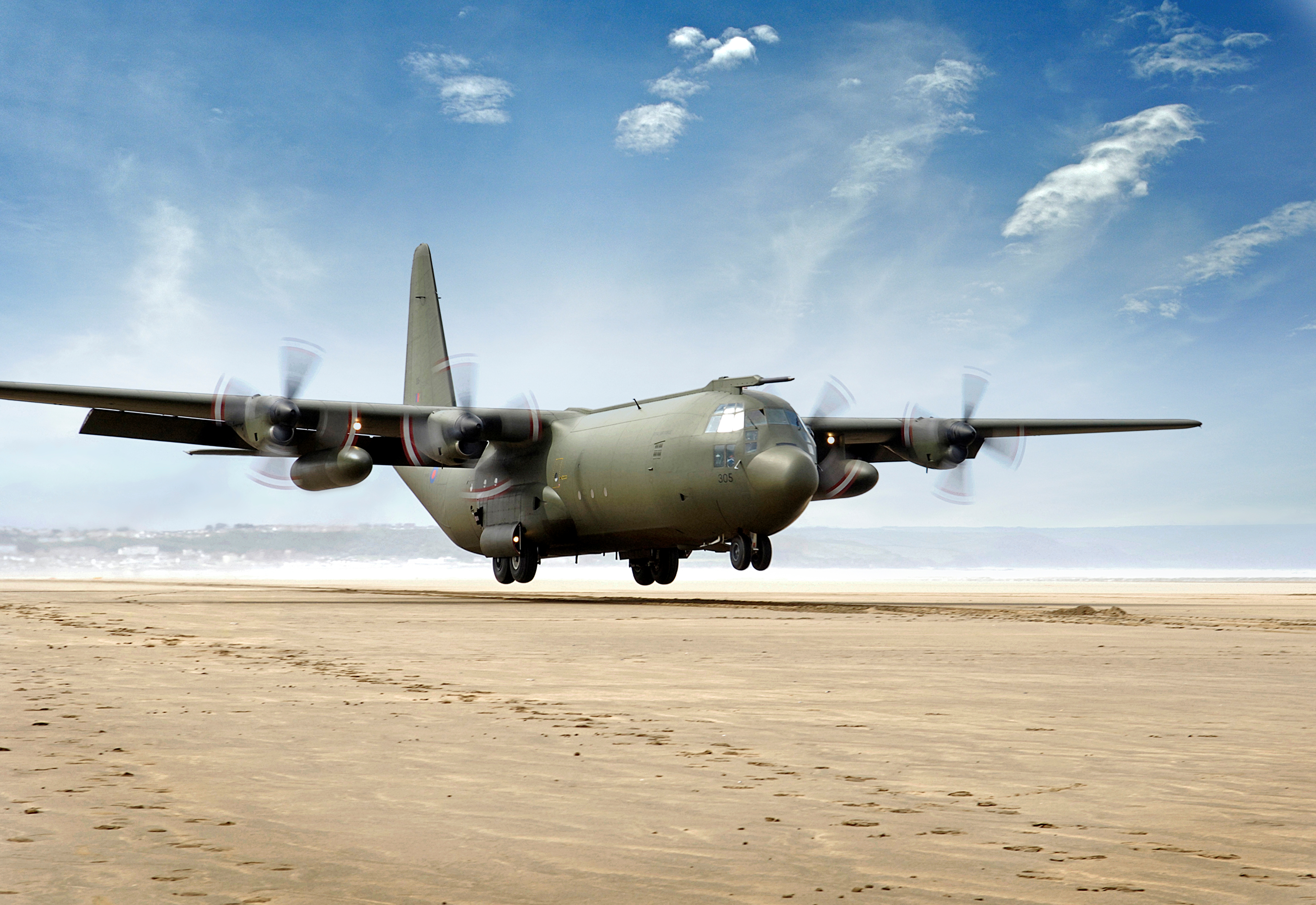
A RAF C-130K Hercules landing at Saunton Sands

Saunton Sands is a beach near the English village of Saunton on the North Devon coast near Braunton, popular for longboard surfing. Beyond its southern end, Crow Point, England is the mouth of the River Taw estuary. It is part of the Taw-Torridge estuary Area of Outstanding Natural Beauty and is at the centre of the UNESCO-designated North Devon's Biosphere Reserve, where Braunton Burrows lies at the heart.

Saunton Sands Hotel overlooks the beach at the northern end. The beach is cordoned off a few times a year and the beach used as an airstrip for military transport planes, usually Lockheed C-130 Hercules of the Royal Air Force, to practise STOL beach landings and take offs. Flying kites is prohibited, accordingly, on part of the beach.

Saunton Sands is popular with surfers because the beach is long, an unusually exposed westerly, and provides space for large groups. The beach has no life guards and is known to have dangerous riptides. Swimming here is dangerous and has resulted in many coast guard call outs.

On 3 August 1990, a temperature of 35.4 °C (95.7 °F) was recorded at Saunton Sands, which is the highest temperature recorded in the Devon and Cornwall region.

== In popular culture ==
=== Film ===
Saunton Sands was used as a location for the 1946 Powell and Pressburger film A Matter of Life and Death (sometimes called Stairway to Heaven), and can be seen where David Niven's character is washed up on the beach after he jumps from his burning aircraft without a parachute. It was a major location for the 1978 horror film The Shout, along with the adjacent Braunton Burrows. The beach was used as a location for the Second World War Anzio landings scenes in the 1982 Pink Floyd film The Wall and as the backdrop for over 700 wrought iron hospital beds on the cover of the band's 1987 album A Momentary Lapse of Reason. Saunton Sands also doubled for the Normandy beaches in 2014's movie Edge of Tomorrow. The beach was utilized for location filming for Aquaman and the Lost Kingdom.

=== Television ===
The BBC One series A Very English Scandal filmed scenes as Saunton Sands to depict a California beach, using digitally rendered palm trees, where the character of Peter Bessell (Alex Jennings) lives.

=== Music ===
In the late 1990s the beach was used for the video for the Robbie Williams song "Angels". In 2013 it was used again for the video for the Olly Murs song "Hand on Heart". In September 2020 the beach was also used for the music video for the Inglorious song "Messiah” From their 2021 album We Will Ride.
