= Saunton =

Village in Devon, England

Coordinates: 51.117°N 04.205°W

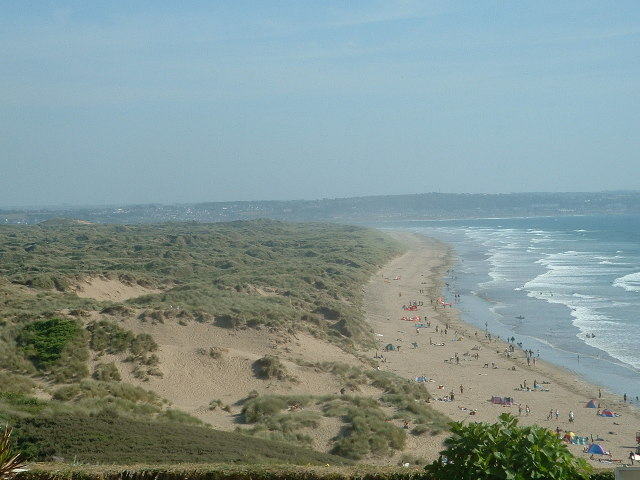

- Location within Devon
- OS grid reference: SS457452
- District: North Devon
- Shire county: Devon
- Region: South West
- Country: England
- Sovereign state: United Kingdom
- Post town: BRAUNTON
- Postcode district: EX33
- Dialling code: 01271
- Police: Devon and Cornwall
- Fire: Devon and Somerset
- Ambulance: South Western

Saunton is a village located approximately two miles from Braunton on the North Devon coast in the South West of England.

Several kilometres long, the village borders Braunton Burrows, the heart of North Devon's Biosphere Reserve, the first "new style" UNESCO-designated Biosphere Reserve. Its beach Saunton Sands is part of the Taw-Torridge Estuary.

In 1994 termites, of the species Reticulitermes grassei, were identified in two bungalows in Saunton. Anecdotal evidence suggests the infestation could date back 70 years before the official identification. In 1998 Termite Eradication Programme was set up, with the intention of containing and eradicating the colony. In 2021 the UK’s Termite Eradication Programme announced the eradication of the colony, the first time a country has eradicated termites.

The Saunton Surf Life Saving Club is based here.

The South West Coast Path National Trail runs through the village, and gives access to walks along the rugged North Devon coast.

Saunton Down lies within the North Devon Coast Area of Outstanding Natural Beauty.

Served by Stagecoach 308 bus service between Barnstaple, Croyde and Georgeham
