= Arkell =

The name Arkell is derived from the Old Scandinavian arn- (eagle) and ketill (kettle or cauldron). It may also be derived from the villages of High Ercall and Child's Ercall in Shropshire.

== People ==
=== Surname ===
- A. J. Arkell (1898–1980), English archaeologist and colonial administrator
- Charles Arkell (1905-1968), Australian Anglican priest
- Frank Arkell (1935–1998), Australian politician
- Henry Arkell (1898–1982), English cricketer
- James Arkell (1829-1911), American businessman and politician
- John Arkell (1835–1923), English rower and clergyman
- Keith Arkell (born 1961), English chess grandmaster
- Ken Arkell (born 1930), Canadian former judge and Canadian football player
- Myles Arkell (1932–2021), English cricketer
- Reginald Arkell (1882–1959), English writer
- Simon Arkell (born 1966), Australian Olympic pole vaulter
- Thomas Arkell (1823–1906), English-Canadian politician
- Valerie Arkell-Smith (1895–1960), English transgender man better known as Colonel Sir Victor Barker
- William Joscelyn Arkell (1904–1958), English geologist and paleontologist

=== Given name ===
- Arkell Jude-Boyd (born 2003), UK-born association football player
- Arkell Smith (born 1999), American gridiron football player

== Other uses ==
- Arkell Cirque, large cirque on the south face of the central Read Mountains in Antarctica
- Arkell Museum, American art and historical museum in Canajoharie, New York
- Arkell Spring Grounds, bedrock aquifer along the Eramosa River in Ontario, Canada
- Arkell's Brewery, privately held English brewery in Swindon
- Arkells, Canadian rock band
- Arkell v. Pressdram a legal case involving Private Eye
- Arkell, Ontario, part of Puslinch, Ontario

== See also ==
- Ackrill (surname)
- Argyle (surname)
