= List of bridges over the River Torridge =

Bridges crossing the River Torridge

The following is a list of bridges over the River Torridge in Devon listed going upstream (south) from the estuary at Bideford. The left bank of a river is that on the left of a traveller progressing downstream.

Bridge	Photo	Date Opened	Left bank	Right bank
Torridge A39 Road Bridge		1987	Northam	Westleigh
Bideford Long Bridge		14th century	Bideford	East-the-Water
The stone original of the present much altered and widened arched bridge is said by the Devon biographer John Prince, (1643–1723) to have been built in the 14th century and chiefly financed, according to Prince, by Sir Theobald II Grenville (d. circa 1377), lord of the manors of Bideford and of Stowe in Cornwall. Hoskins (1954), however, states the date of the stone bridge, which replaced an earlier timber bridge, later at circa 1460.
Half-Penny Bridge, Weare Giffard		1835	Annery, Monkleigh	Weare Giffard
Halfpenny Bridge, looking downstream to Bideford. Viewed from side on former estate of Annery in parish of Monkleigh, far side in Weare Giffard parish. It was built as a toll bridge in 1835, at the initiative of local landowners and was privately financed through raising £1,000 in £50 shares. The tollhouse was situated on the Weare Gifford side, on the downstream side. The toll was 1/2 penny for foot passengers and 4 pence for horse-drawn carriages. It marks the end of the tidal stretch of the river.
Beam Aqueduct		1824	Monkleigh	Beam House, Great Torrington
The Beam Aqueduct carried the Rolle Canal over the River Torridge. It was later converted into a road bridge to form a new entrance drive to Beam House. A stone tablet on the north parapet of the Beam Aqueduct is inscribed: "The first stone of this aqueduct was laid by the Right Honourable John Lord Rolle, Baron Rolle of Stevenstone in the county of Devon, on the 11th day of August 182(4?) in the presence of the mayor, corporation and feoffees of Great Torrington and other persons assembled to witness the commencement of the" ...(word chiselled out (ROLLE?)... "CANAL undertaken at the sole expense of his Lordship. James Green Engineer". Frequent reference is made to it as the "Canal Bridge" in Henry Williamson's novel Tarka the Otter, especially as the place of Tarka's birth.
Rothern Bridge		15th.century	Frithelstock	Great Torrington
A legacy was left for the upkeep of Rothern Bridge and Taddiport Bridge in the will of the judge Sir William Hankford (d.1423) of nearby Annery in the parish of Monkleigh. In Williamson's 1927 novel Tarka the Otter he wrote: "(Tarka) swam under Rothern Bridge whose three (sic) stone arches, bearing heavy motor-transport beyond their old age, showed the cracks of suffering that the ferns were filling green. A sycamore grew out of its lower parapet". Following the opening in 1928 of the adjacent Rolle Bridge, the demolition of Rothern Bridge was proposed, but rejected due to popular outcry. It was refaced in the early 19th century. Rothern Bridge is today disused and classed as a scheduled ancient monument.
Rolle Bridge		1928	Frithelstock	Great Torrington
Rolle Bridge was built in 1928 slightly upstream of Rothern Bridge, which it replaced as the conduit of the A386 main road from the north-west of Torrington to Bideford. The bridge is next to the disused railway station of Great Torrington and carries the road on an upwards incline towards Torrington. Three commemorative stone tablets are set into the parapet: highest tablet: "Borough of Great Torrington. Mayor 1927-28 Lt.Col. A.R. O'Flaherty; 1928-29 T. Dyer; C.H. Slee Senior Alderman; R.Boase Town Clerk"; middle tablet: "Rolle Bridge. Erected 1928 at joint expense of Ministry of Transport, Devon County Council, Great Torrington Town and Alms Lands Charities. B S Miller, Clerk; R M Stone, Surveyor"; lowest tablet: "Devon County Council Bridges & Main Roads Committee 1928. Chairman: W.E. Coulton; Vice-Chairmen: H. Higgs, T. Lake, Major G.S.S. Strode. Local members of council: J.M. Metherell, J.T. Lyle, Lt.Col. Gracey, A. Galsworthy, J. Puddicombe, A. Trible, Lord Clinton". Lord Rolle (d.1842) of Stevenstone was lord of the manor of Great Torrington and some of his benefactions were amalgamated after his death into the Great Torrington Town and Alms Lands Charities. His ultimate heir was Lord Clinton, a local member of Devon County Council.
Taddiport Bridge/Town Bridge		Mediaeval; pre-1311	Taddiport	Mill Street, Great Torrington/Old Dairy Factory
Taddiport Bridge is the oldest of the three bridges at Great Torrington and has been strengthened and altered many times. A legacy was left for the upkeep of Taddiport Bridge and Rothern Bridge in the will of the judge Sir William Hankford (d.1423) of nearby Annery in the parish of Monkleigh.
New Bridge		1843	Cock's Shilhay	Town Mills (Orford Mill)/Town Mill Lodge/Rosemoor
New Bridge carries the A386 over the River Torridge from the south-east side of Great Torrington to Tavistock and Plymouth. It was built by John Rolle, 1st Baron Rolle (d.1842) of nearby Stevenstone, lord of the manor of Great Torrington, under the supervision of Thomas Whitaker, successor to James Green as county surveyor. A memorial stone tablet on the parapet on the upstream side states: "By the munificence of the Right Hon.ble John Lord Rolle this bridge was erected AD 1843. T. Whitaker, county surveyor". It is situated immediately downstream of Town Mills, Lord Rolle's castellated mill complex past which flowed his Rolle Canal and which matches Lord Rolle's castellated walls of the former site of Great Torrington Castle, both sites being visible from the bridge. A small arch to accommodate the Rolle Canal exists on the right bank side of New Bridge. Town Mill Lodge, one of the many gatehouses to Stevenstone is situated on the right bank of the Torridge at this point.

== Sources ==
- Pevsner, Nikolaus & Cherry, Bridget (2004). The Buildings of England – Devon. Yale University Press. ISBN 0300095961.
