= Torridge Bridge =

Concrete bridge in Devon, England

Torridge Bridge A39 Bridge
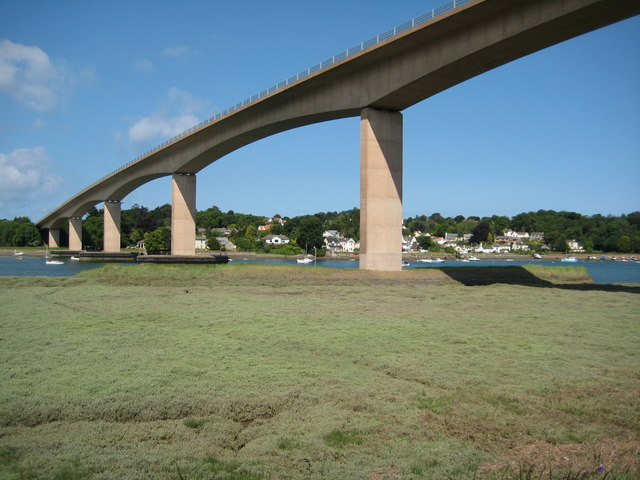
- View in June 2009
- Coordinates: 51.0296°N 4.2°W
- Carries: Vehicles on A39
- Crosses: River Torridge
- Locale: Bideford, Devon

Characteristics
- Design: Viaduct, with prestressed concrete cantilever box girder
- Material: Reinforced concrete
- Total length: 650 m (2,130 ft)
- Width: 13.3m
- Height: 24m
- No. of spans: 8
- Piers in water: 3 (2,3 and 4)

History
- Designer: C.H. Pothecary
- Engineering design by: MRM Partnership
- Construction end: May 1987
- Opened: 20 May 1987

Location
- Interactive map of Torridge Bridge

The Torridge Bridge is a 650-metre-long concrete bridge, situated broadly in an east-west direction, built in 1987 in Bideford, England over the River Torridge. The bridge provides a bypass to Bideford avoiding the Bideford Long Bridge.

Known additionally for its suicides the bridge has since been improved, with the installation of higher railings.

The road expansion joints on the west side were replaced in 2020 mitigating the loud "bonking" noise caused by passing road traffic.

(From the 1927 book Tarka the Otter; the Tarka Trail passes under the location of the bridge).

== History ==
=== Design ===
Three piers are in the river. Each of the piers in the water is protected by concrete fenders 24m long by 8 metres wide by 8 metres high. The concrete piers of the bridge are around 24m high. It was designed by MRM Partnership, now part of WSP Global.

Calculations were made for the possible effect of cross-wind and shear. It was designed by 1980.

The bridge has no provisions for cycling, cyclists share the main carriageway with cars. Although pedestrians aren't banned from the bridge there are no pavements or footpaths on the roads approaching the bridge. There are emergency pavements on the bridge itself.

=== Construction ===
The bridge deck waterproofing system (Icosit Membrane) was made by Sika Inertol of Welwyn Garden City in Hertfordshire. The concrete was made from 60% blastfurnace cement and 40% cement, and made by Blue Circle on-site. Salt aggregates came from ECC Quarries. The prestressing metal cable was provided by British Ropes (of Doncaster in South Yorkshire).

Each section of the bridge was built with a 377-feet-long gantry leg, or launching girder, from the neighbouring concrete pier, by the balanced-cantilever method. The bridge is made from 251 9-feet-long pre-cast segments, each weighing up to 105 tonnes. Each precast box unit took one day to cast.

It won the 1988 Concrete Society Award.

It opened on Wednesday 20 May 1987 by the High Sheriff of Devon. It was opened as part of the 8 km Bideford Bypass. The bypass contract had taken two and a half years.

== Structure ==
The bridge lies between the districts of North Devon, to the east, and Torridge, to the west, and around a half-mile north of Bideford. It is accessed via a roundabout with the A386, to the west, and a junction with the B3233, to the east. The South West Coast Path passes under the bridge, on the east bank, and passes near the west bank. The East bank of the bridge is in Westleigh, Devon.

The A39, that it carries, is known as the Atlantic Highway, which originates at junction 27 of the M5 at Burlescombe and Sampford Peverell in Devon, close to the Somerset boundary.

== See also ==
- List of bridges over the River Torridge
