= David Cobham =

British film/TV director and producer (1930 – 2018)

Personal information
- Full name: Michael David Cobham
- Born: 11 May 1930; Boynton, East Riding of Yorkshire, England
- Died: 5 March 2018 (aged 87); Dereham, Norfolk, England
- Height: 6 ft 7 in (2.01 m)
- Batting: Right-handed
- Bowling: Right-arm fast-medium

Domestic team information
- Years: Team
- 1948: Berkshire

Career statistics
Competition	First-class
Matches	1
Runs scored	0
Batting average	0.00
100s/50s	–/–
Top score	0
Balls bowled	102
Wickets	2
Bowling average	27.00
5 wickets in innings	–
10 wickets in match	–
Best bowling	2/21
Catches/stumpings	–/–
- Source: Cricinfo, 7 February 2019

Michael David Cobham (11 May 1930 – 25 March 2018) was a British film and TV producer and director, best known for the film Tarka the Otter. He was also a first-class cricketer.

== Early life ==
Cobham was educated at Stowe School, where he played for the school cricket team, before going up to Corpus Christi College, Cambridge to read natural sciences.

== Cricket career ==
He played minor counties cricket for Berkshire in the 1948 Minor Counties Championship, making five appearances. He later made an appearance in first-class cricket for the Free Foresters against Cambridge University at Fenner's in 1953. He bowled ten wicket-less overs in Cambridge University's first-innings, before taking the wickets of Mike Bushby and Dennis Silk in their second-innings to finish with figures of 2 for 21 from seven overs. He failed to score while batting, being dismissed in the Free Foresters' first-innings by Myles Arkell and Raman Subba Row in their second-innings.

== Filmmaking career ==
Cobham directed the BBC's first wildlife film The Vanishing Hedgerows in 1972 with Henry Williamson noting changes brought about by new farming methods. At the Monte-Carlo Television Festival, it won a silver nymph in the category for documentaries.

Tarka the Otter is a 1979 British adventure film directed by Cobham, based on the 1927 novel of the same name by Williamson. Tarka the Otter was voted 98th in Channel 4’s poll of the 100 Greatest Family Films.

He also directed and produced the children's TV series Bernard's Watch, Brendon Chase, The Secret World of Polly Flint, Out of Sight, Woof! and the wildlife-orientated Seal Morning (1986). His wildlife films include The Goshawk (1968), and To Build a Fire (1969), narrated by Orson Welles. He also directed a BBC series about Japan, In the Shadow of Fujisan (BBC One 1987 and BBC Four 2009). Other projects included One Pair of Eyes (1970) about the sculptor John Skeaping, Survival in Limbo (1976) starring Duncan Carse, and he was also the director/producer for BP's film of Donald Campbell's Land Speed Record attempt at Utah in 1960.

== Books ==
Cobham's first book, A Sparrowhawk's Lament: How British Breeding Birds of Prey Are Faring, was published in 2014; his next book, Bowland Beth: The Life of an English Hen Harrier, a study of the persecution of the hen harrier on the grouse moors of the Forest of Bowland, was published in 2017.

== Death ==
Cobham died of a stroke on 25 March 2018 at the age of 87. He is survived by his wife Liza Goddard, ex-president of the Hawk and Owl Trust, of which he was vice-president.
