= Tone Aqueduct =

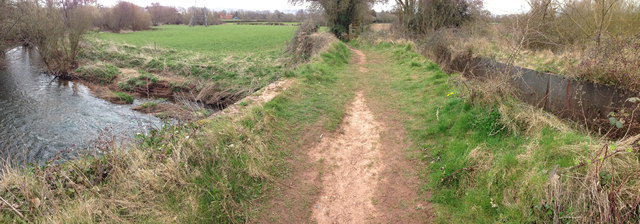
- The aqueduct in 2015
- Coordinates: 50.994193°N 3.216909°W
- Carries: Grand Western Canal (now disused)
- Crosses: River Tone
- Heritage status: Grade II Listed building
- Historic England Listing Entry Number: 1060354

Characteristics
- Material: Cast iron
- Traversable?: No (now drained)
- No. of spans: 1

History
- Designer: James Green
- Construction end: 1828

The Tone Aqueduct, near Nynehead, Somerset, was built in 1828 and is now disused. It formerly carried the Grand Western Canal over the River Tone.

== Description ==
Built by James Green about 1828, this aqueduct comprises a cast iron trough supported by a single-span stone arch. It is now registered by Historic England as a Grade II listed building.
