= Marland =

Marland can refer to:

== People ==
- Caroline Marland (born 1946), British businesswoman, advertiser and newspaper managing director
- Douglas Marland (1934–1993), American soap opera script writer
- E. W. Marland (1874–1941), Oklahoma governor
- Jonathan Marland, Baron Marland, British businessman and Conservative politician
- Lydie Marland, American socialite
- Margaret Marland, Canadian politician
- Paul Marland, British politician
- Robert Marland, Canadian Olympic rower
- William C. Marland, West Virginia governor

== Places ==
- Marland, Oklahoma, a town
- Marland, Greater Manchester, part of the town of Rochdale
- Marland Works railway station, disused station in Devon, England
- Peters Marland, a village in Devon

== Other ==
- Marland Oil Company
- Marland report, a Federal report on gifted and talented education in the U.S.A.
