= Tarka the Otter (film) =

- Directed by: David Cobham
- Written by: Gerald Durrell; David Cobham
- Based on: Novel by Henry Williamson
- Produced by: David Cobham
- Starring: Spade
- Narrated by: Peter Ustinov
- Cinematography: Terry Channell; John McCallum
- Edited by: Charles Davies
- Music by: David Fanshawe
- Distributed by: Rank Film Distributors
- Release date: 2 November 1979
- Running time: 87 minutes
- Country: United Kingdom
- Language: English
- Budget: £300,000

Tarka the Otter is a 1979 British adventure film directed by David Cobham. It is based on the 1927 novel of the same name by Henry Williamson. Tarka the Otter was voted 98th in Channel 4’s poll of the 100 Greatest Family Films.

== Premise ==
The film tells the life of an English otter in the 1920s when otterhunting was still prevalent as a field sport. The otter Tarka journeys up and down the river, finding love, escaping from dangers and finally confronting the feared otterhound Deadlock.

== Cast ==
The role of Tarka was played by an otter called Spade.

== Production ==
David and Janet Cobham were documentary filmmakers. In 1970 they met Henry Williamson when commissioned to make a television programme The Vanishing Hedgerows about changes in farming methods. They persuaded Williamson to sell them the rights to Tarka the Otter which Williamson had refused to sell over the years, including an offer from Disney. David Cobham said he thought Williamson responded to him because the author knew Cobham would not make a sentimentalised film. They took an option for three years and raised the money to write a script. Williamson was going to write the screenplay, but he became too ill so the job was done by Gerald Durrell and Cobham, with Cobham working off an extended treatment of Durrell's Part of the finance came from the Rank Organisation.

In August 1976 it was announced that filming had started in the south of England, and it was expected it would take 18 months to make. The film was shot on Dartmoor and the River Torridge. Williamson died in August 1977 when the unit was filming the death of Tarka.

== Musical score ==
The music score used in the film, composed by David Fanshawe, was released on a soundtrack album on the Argo label in 1979 (ZSW 613), and included Peter Ustinov's narration.

In 1976 Anthony Phillips, formerly a guitarist with Genesis, and Harry Williamson, son of the author, had recorded a soundtrack to the film with the support of David Cobham, the producer. Harry had helped to persuade his father to sign the contract, reassuring him that with the music he had composed, the film would be true to the book. However, the orchestral work was not used. In 1987, Amy International paid for the completion of the work at Strawberry Studios and it was released by PRT records as simply Tarka. In 2001 the work was re-released with additional music by Voiceprint Records. The music was commissioned for its first live performance with a symphony orchestra in Melbourne in February 2010.

== Reception ==
The movie received an "A" rating.

The Guardian called it " a very worthy but rather dull summation of Henry Williamson's book." The Daily Telegraph wrote the book "could hardly have been brought to the screen with more evident, affection and skill."
