= Tub boat =

Canal cargo boat

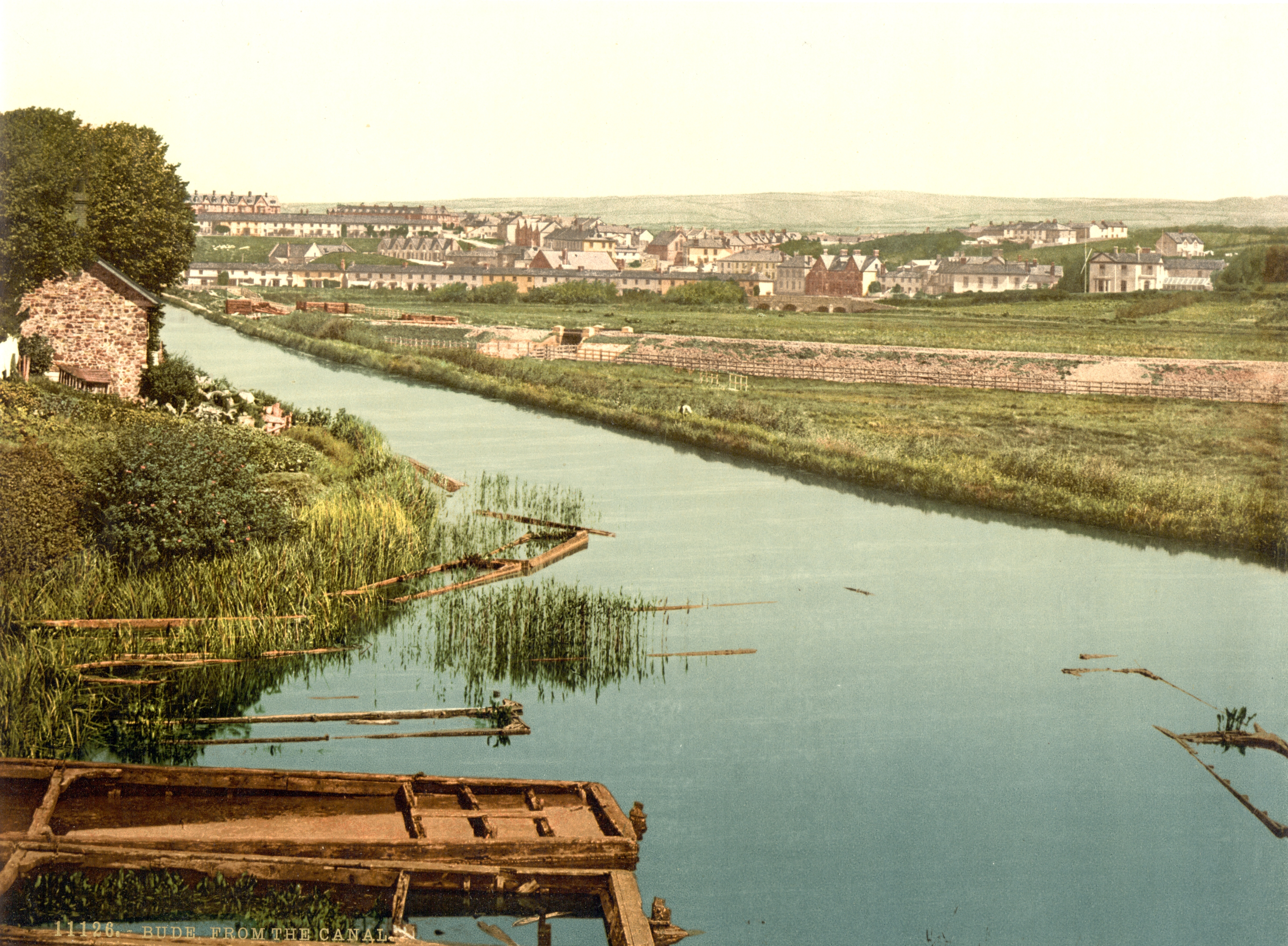
Sunken tub boats in the Bude Canal at the end of the 19th century

A tub boat was a type of unpowered cargo boat used on a number of the early English and German canals.

There was no standardisation of tub boat size between different canals, but a typical English tub boat canal might have used boats around 20 ft (6.1 m) long and 6 ft 6 in (2.0 m) wide and generally carried 3 long tons (3.0 t; 3.4 short tons) to 5 long tons (5.1 t; 5.6 short tons) of cargo, though some extra deep ones could carry up to 8 long tons (8.1 t; 9.0 short tons). They are also called compartment boats or container boats.

The main virtue of tub boats was their flexibility. They could be drawn in trains of 3-10 or more boats using horse power, or later steam tugs, where the number of boats was varied according to the type of cargo. Tubs could be lifted more easily than larger boats and tub boat lifts and inclined planes were developed as an alternative to canal locks, particularly in or near a colliery or similar industrial works. At a lift the train could easily be divided, the boats lifted individually, and the train reassembled afterwards. Sometimes the boats used snug-fitting non-waterproof inner containers which could be more easily lifted out. Because of their small size, the canals that were built for tub boats could also be smaller, saving considerable construction cost.

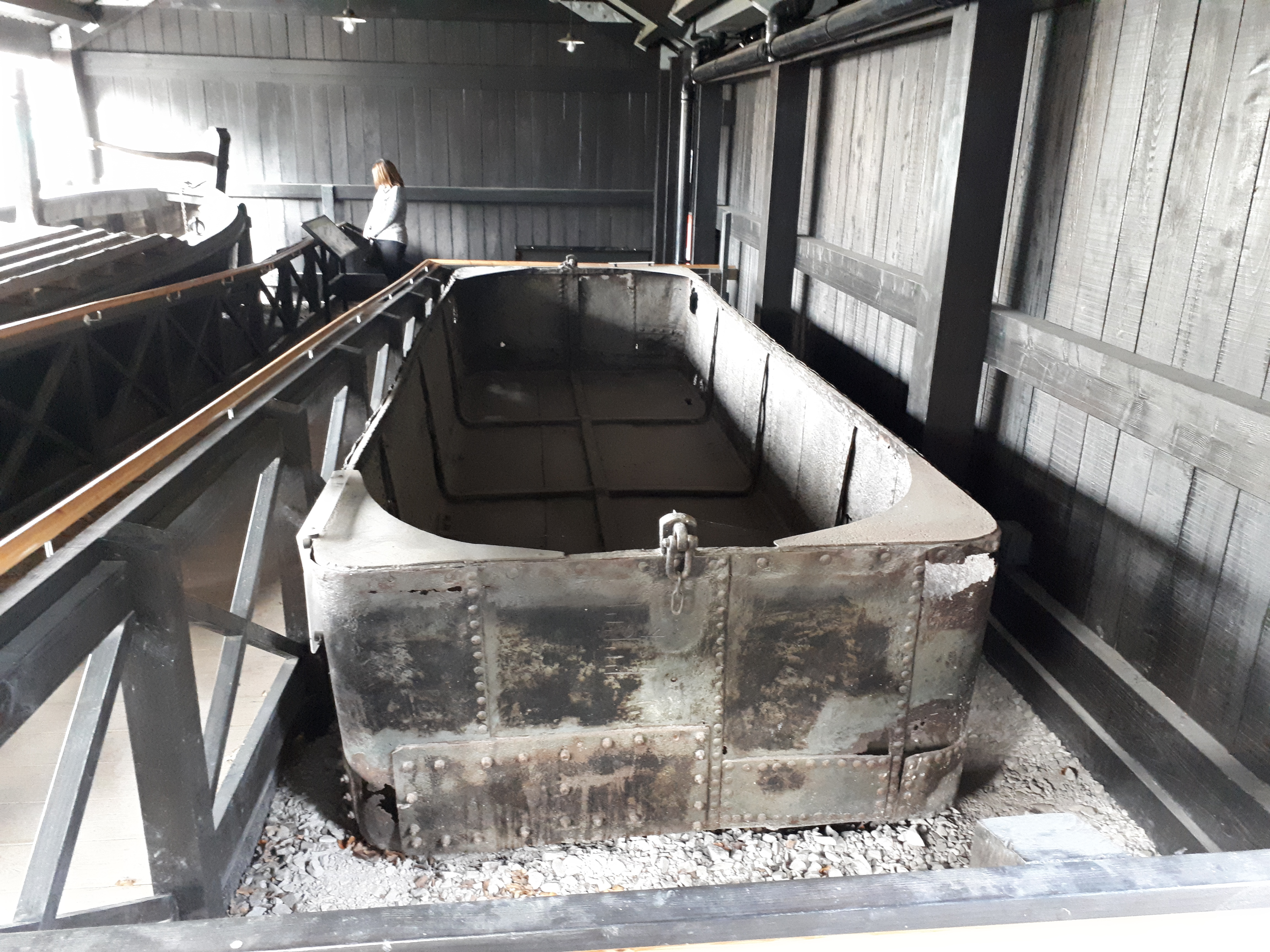
Tub boat at Blists Hill museum

The first use of tub boats in England was on the Bridgewater Canal. Other notable uses were on the Shropshire Union Canal and the Bude Canal.

One tub-boat is preserved in the Blists Hill Victorian Town museum. It was rescued from a farm in 1972, where it was in use as a water tank. Before its discovery, it was thought that all tub boats on the Shropshire Canal were made of wood.

In later years, larger versions of tub boats included the Tom Pudding on the Aire and Calder Canal and the Hargreave barge used on the same waterway.

== List of tub boat canals ==
- Bude Canal, Cornwall
- Chard Canal, Somerset
- Cyfarthfa Canal, Merthyr Tydfil, Wales
- Donnington Wood Canal, East Shropshire
- Dukart's Canal, Tyrone, Northern Ireland
- Grand Western Canal, Devon
- Ketley Canal, East Shropshire
- Lydney Canal, Gloucestershire
- Shropshire Canal, East Shropshire
- Tavistock Canal, Devon
- Torrington Canal, Devon
- Wombridge Canal, East Shropshire

== See also ==
- Barge
- Tarai-bune
