= Ackrill =

Ackrill is an English family name. Notable people with the name include:

- J. L. Ackrill (1921–2007), English philosopher and classicist
- Robert Ackrill (1816–1894), English journalist, newspaper proprietor, printer and writer
