= Victor Barker =

Transgender man

- As Colonel Barker
- Born: Lillias Irma Valerie Barker; 27 August 1895; Saint Clement, Jersey
- Died: 18 February 1960 (aged 64); Lowestoft, Suffolk, England
- Resting place: Kessingland Churchyard, Suffolk
- Other names: Leslie Ivor Victor Gauntlett Bligh Barker; John Hill; Geoffrey Norton

Victor Barker, born Lillias Irma Valerie Barker (27 August 1895 – 18 February 1960) and called Valerie Arkell-Smith after marriage and who also went by the pseudonyms John Hill and Geoffrey Norton, was a transgender man who is notable for having married a woman. He was an officer of the National Fascisti, as well as a bankrupt and a convicted criminal.

== Early life ==
Barker was born Lillias Irma Valerie Barker on 27 August 1895 in Saint Clement on the Channel Island of Jersey, the child of Lillias Adelaide Hill and her husband, farmer and architect Thomas William Barker. The family moved to Surrey in 1899.

In April 1918, Barker married an Australian man, Lieutenant Harold Arkell Smith, in Milford, Surrey. The marriage lasted only a short period and Barker's husband returned to Australia early the following year. On 26 August 1918, Barker enrolled as a member of the Women's Royal Air Force. After the war, Barker moved in with Ernest Pearce-Crouch, also of the Australian Imperial Force; the couple had a son and a daughter. After they had moved to a farm at Climping near Littlehampton, West Sussex, Barker started to dress in a more masculine way.

== Marriage to Elfrida Emma Haward ==
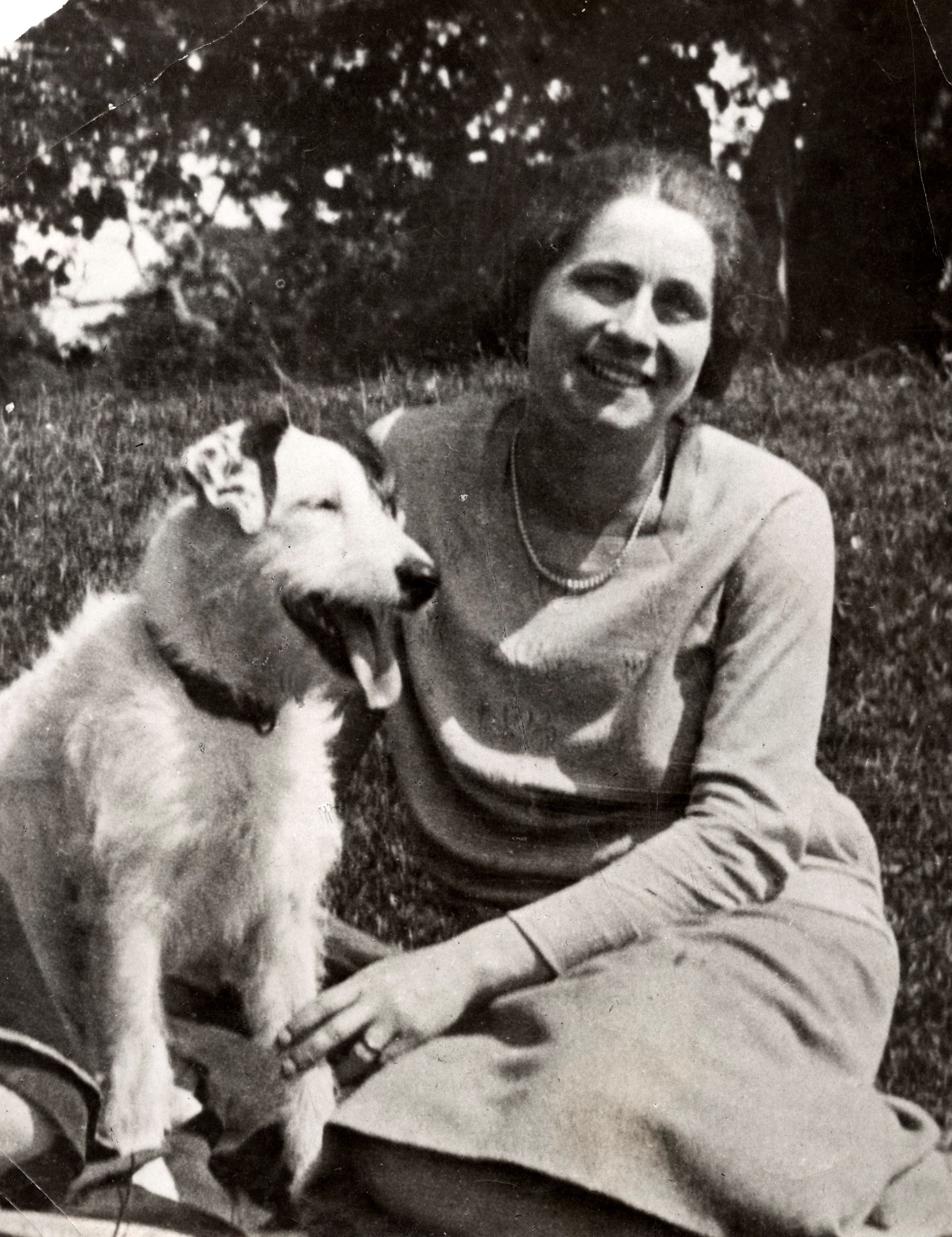
Elfrida Emma Haward

Barker left Pearce-Crouch in 1923 and began a relationship with Elfrida Emma Haward. Although Barker was presenting as a woman when Haward first met him, Barker wrote that he told her that he was "a man who had been injured in the war; that I was really a man acting as a woman for family reasons. I made some excuse about it being my mother's wish, and she believed it." The couple began living at the Grand Hotel in Brighton. By then, Barker had begun to use the name Sir Victor Barker. On 14 November 1923 at St Peter's Church, Brighton, Barker and Haward wed in what was later judged to be an illegal marriage.

== Fascism ==
In 1926 while living in London, Barker received a letter addressed to a different Colonel Barker, inviting him to join the National Fascisti. Barker replied to the misdirected letter with the missive "why not", reasoning that membership of what was a macho group would help him pose as a man. He lived at the National Fascisti headquarters in Earl's Court where he worked as secretary for the group's leader Henry Rippon Seymour, also involving himself in training young members in boxing and fencing. Barker involved himself in the kind of rough-housing that became the hallmark of the group and later recalled that "I used to go out with the boys to Hyde Park and we had many rows with the Reds." That he was transgender was never picked up on by his fellow members.

In 1927, he was brought before the Old Bailey on charges of possessing a forged firearm certificate after Rippon Seymour had pulled Barker's revolver on another member, Charles Eyres, in a dispute over party funds. "Colonel Barker" was found not guilty and left the group soon after the trial.

== Bankruptcy, prison and later life ==
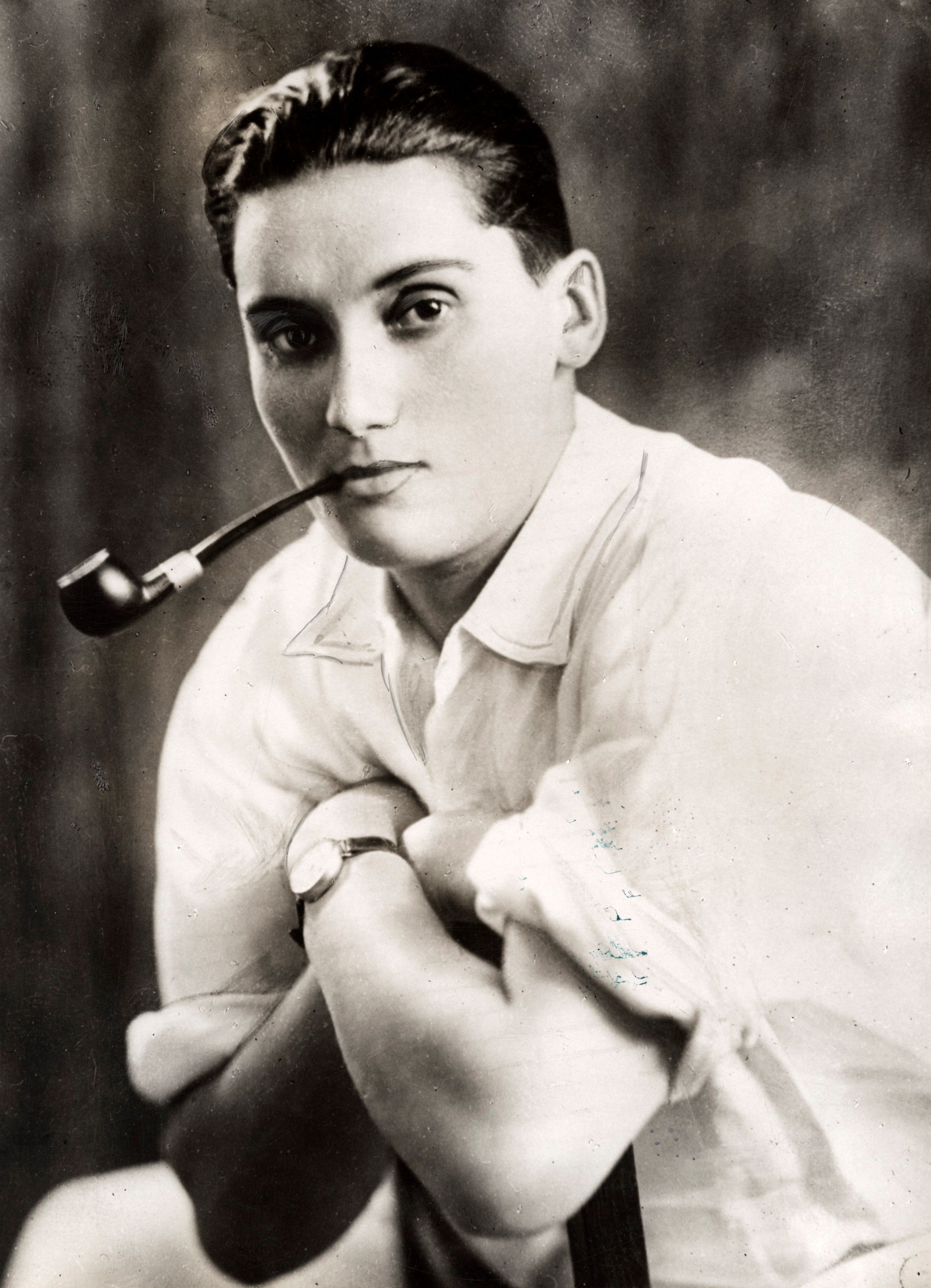
Barker as Ivor Gauntlett

As Leslie Ivor Victor Gauntlett Bligh Barker, restaurant proprietor, he was made bankrupt in 1928; the London Gazette notice was amended some months later to "Lillias Irma Valerie Arkell-Smith ... commonly known as Leslie Ivor Victor Gauntlett Bligh Barker".

In 1929, Barker was arrested at the Regent Palace Hotel, London, for contempt of court for failing to appear in connection with the bankruptcy proceedings. Barker was held in Brixton prison before transfer to a woman's prison, Holloway.

Barker was ultimately charged with, and convicted of, making a false statement on a marriage certificate. The judge, Sir Ernest Wild, the Recorder of London, sentenced him to nine months' imprisonment on this charge; from the bench, Wild said that Barker had "profaned the house of God". After being released from Holloway, Barker moved to Henfield, West Sussex, where he lived as John Hill. While there, in 1934, he was arrested for theft but acquitted. In 1937 when employed as a manservant in London, he pleaded guilty to theft and was fined.

Later, he wrote about his life several times in popular newspapers and magazines. As Colonel Barker, he appeared in a Blackpool sideshow called "On a Strange Honeymoon" in the 1930s.

== Death ==
Barker died in obscurity, under the name Geoffrey Norton, on 18 February 1960. The probate notice refers to Lillias Irma Valerie Arkell-Smith or Geoffrey Norton, married woman, with an address in Kessingland, Suffolk.

== Legacy ==
D. H. Lawrence, in the essay "A Propos of Lady Chatterley's Lover" (1929), described Barker as having "married a wife and lived five years with her in 'conjugal happiness'. And the poor wife thought all the time that she was married normally and happily to a real husband!", and stated that this was a tragic example of what could happen when women were ignorant of how sexual intercourse works.

The story of the many lives of Barker is told in Colonel Barker's Monstrous Regiment by Rose Collis, Virago 2001.

Brighton Museum and History Centre marked his life during February 2006, as part of England's LGBT month's celebrations.

"The Perfect Gentleman", one of the Queers: Eight Monologues (2017), curated by Mark Gatiss, was based on Barker.

In Female Masculinity (1998), Jack Halberstam writes that Barker represented "the beginning of the emergence of a transsexual identity."
