= Bideford Long Bridge =

Bridge in Devon, England

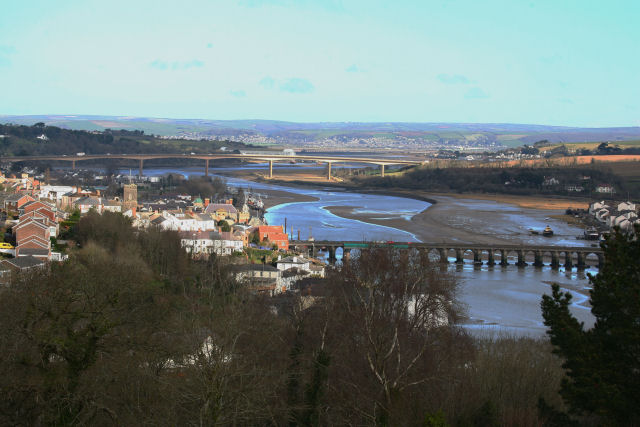
- Bideford Long Bridge, looking downstream from Upcott Hill. Beyond closer to the estuary is the A39 Road Bridge built in 1987
- Coordinates: 51.0165°N 4.2034°W
- Crosses: River Torridge
- Locale: Between Bideford and East-the-Water, Devon, England
- Maintained by: Bideford Bridge Trust (until 1968); Department for Transport (since 1968)
- Next upstream: Torridge A39 Road Bridge
- Next downstream: Halfpenny Bridge

Characteristics
- Material: Stone
- Total length: 677 feet (206 m)
- No. of spans: 24

History
- Built: Late 13th century
- Rebuilt: 14th century

Location
- Interactive map of Bideford Long Bridge

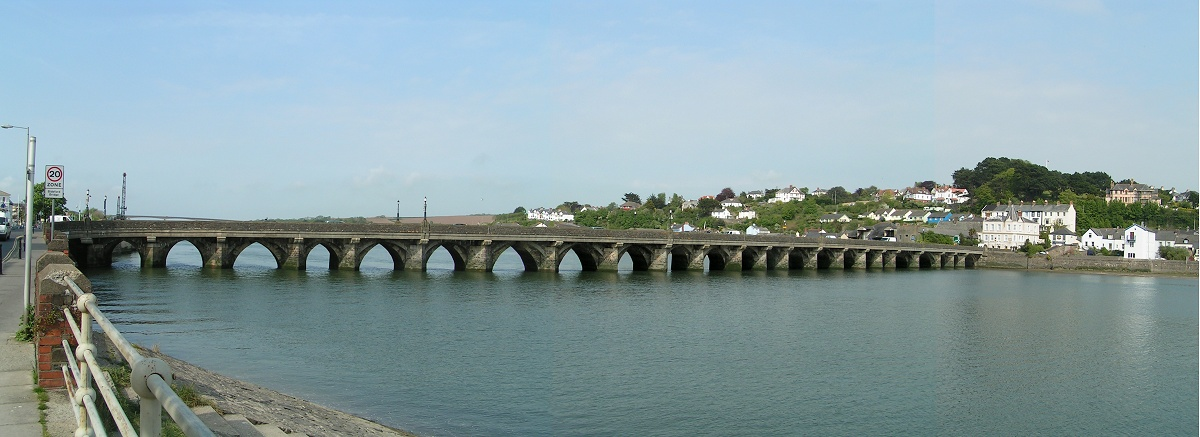
Bideford Long Bridge over River Torridge. Viewed from Bideford side looking downstream (north) with East-the-Water on the far (east) side

Bideford Long Bridge in North Devon spans the River Torridge near its estuary and connects the old part of the town, and formerly important river port, of Bideford on the left bank (west side) with East-the-Water on the right bank (east side). It is one of the longest mediaeval bridges in England, being 677 feet (222 yards) long with 24 arches. In 1790 the bridge was the longest in Devon. It remained the furthest downstream bridge on the river until 1987, when the Torridge A39 Road Bridge was built a mile or so further downstream at Northam. The river is still tidal at Bideford (and as far upstream as Weare Giffard) and a very large fluctuation in water levels occurs twice daily under the bridge. An ancient New Year's Eve tradition was to try to run across the Long Bridge during the time taken for the bells of St. Mary's parish church, near the west end, to chime midnight. A sight enjoyed by many in the winter months is of the starlings at dusk, as they come in large flocks to roost underneath the bridge.

It is a Grade I listed building. Another major medieval bridge, the Barnstaple Long Bridge in Barnstaple over the Taw, is a few miles away. A large scale model of the Long Bridge in all its stages from 1280 to 1925 is displayed at the Burton at Bideford museum in the town.

== History ==
=== Wooden bridge ===
The Devon historian William George Hoskins (1959) stated that the first bridge was built in the last quarter of the 13th century, and made from oak wood. The length of sections between piers were not uniform but were determined by the varying lengths of timber available. The bridge was rebuilt in stone in the 14th century with arch piers around this wooden bridge, using it as a form of scaffolding, thus the arches are not uniform in width but vary in the same proportion as the wooden lintels of the original bridge. Two other traditional explanations for the varying spans exist. Firstly that each arch was funded by a different local guild and built piecemeal; secondly that the piers of the arches were built on naturally existing and therefore randomly situated large stones in the river. The existence of a bridge before that built or rebuilt traditionally by Sir Theobald Grenville is confirmed by a bequest of 40 shillings in the will of Bishop of Exeter Walter de Stapledon (d.1326) for the maintenance of Bideford Bridge.

=== Stone bridge ===
The stone original of the present arched bridge is said by the Devon biographer John Prince, (1643–1723) to have been built in the 14th century and chiefly financed, according to Prince, by Sir Theobald II Grenville (d. circa 1377), lord of the manors of Bideford and of Stowe in Cornwall, and father of Sir Theobald III Grenville. Sir Theobald Grenville II was the son and heir of Henry de Grenville, and was aged 4 at the death of his father when he was granted in wardship to Sir John Carew. He was knighted on attaining his majority aged 21, and was, according to Granville (1895) but not supported by other sources, Sheriff of Devon in 1347. He married Joyce Beaumont, according to Granville (1895), daughter of Thomas Beaumont, Earl of Mellant (sic), perhaps Count of Meulan. The bridge was probably built during his minority.

Other donors were the families of "Goldneye" (or Gurney) and Oketenet, which according to Thomas Fuller (1608-1661) were locally powerful families. The Devon historian Risdon, Tristram (d.1640) claimed to have seen "a large catalogue containing the names of the bridge's benefactors wherein few families of any eminence in these western parts were omitted to be registered". It was at the time far from any main road, so is presumed to have been built mainly for the convenience of the townspeople. On 5 December 1396 Bishop of Exeter Edmund Stafford (ruled 1395–1419) granted an indulgence to all true penitents who should assist "ad constructionem seu reparacionem longi pontis de Bydeford" ("towards the construction or repair of the long bridge of Bideford"). Later in 1437 and 1444 two further indulgences "ad novam constructionem sustentationem seu reparacionem pontis de Bydeford" ("to the new-building, sustaining or repair of Bideford Bridge") were granted by Bishop of Exeter Edmund Lacey (reigned 1420–1455). The last episcopal indulgence in connection with repairs to the bridge was granted in 1503 by Bishop of Exeter John Arundel (reigned 1502–1504).

It was considered until the 18th century very high "so that a bark of 60 or 70 tuns may pass and re-pass under the arches and between the peers thereof", (Prince) although with its masts struck. Tradition states that, like London Bridge, its piers were built on wool bales, an allusion to the great wealth generated by the wool-trade to the economy of England in the Middle Ages. In fact the foundations are firmly fixed, although the bridge according to Prince "seems to shake at the slightest step of a horse".

While one of the larger medieval bridges, it was exceeded by others, such as the almost intact Swarkestone Bridge and the old long bridge over the River Trent at Burton upon Trent, Staffordshire, demolished in 1864. which was 515 yards long, 15 feet wide and had 36 arches.

=== Legendary origins ===
Prince relates that before the building of the bridge the crossing over the broad and at times rough river was a dangerous action and frequently resulted in deaths from drowning. The parish priest of Bideford, Richard Gornard (or Gurney), "was admonished by a vision in his sleep to set on the foundation of a bridge near a rock which he should find rolled from the higher grounds upon the strand". In the morning he went to the river bank and found there a huge rock "whose greatness argued its being in that place to be only the work of God". He thus was incited to set forward the charitable work of founding a bridge, and gained to his cause the lord of the manor of Bideford Sir Theobald Grenville. Gornard disclosed his vision to the Bishop of Exeter, according to Fuller Bishop Peter Quinel (reigned 1280–1291), but corrected by Prince to Bishop John Grandisson (reigned 1327–1369), who sent forth "indulgences and licences to collect the benevolence of all the brethren and sisters within his bishopric". The appeal for funds was cheerfully received and "the greater personages allowed a certain number of workmen and some lands towards it, the common people some weeks, others a month's work, all striving...according to their utmost abilities for the furtherance of so charitable a design". Furthermore, "succeeding bishops in their distinct times did contribute alms and divulge benedictions to every man and woman that should be benefactotrs...causing it to be published in churches, in the cathedral church of Exeter and throughout the whole diocese of Devon and Cornwall 'that they should participate of all spiritual blessings forever that would encourage and promote so good a work'".

== Widening & alterations ==
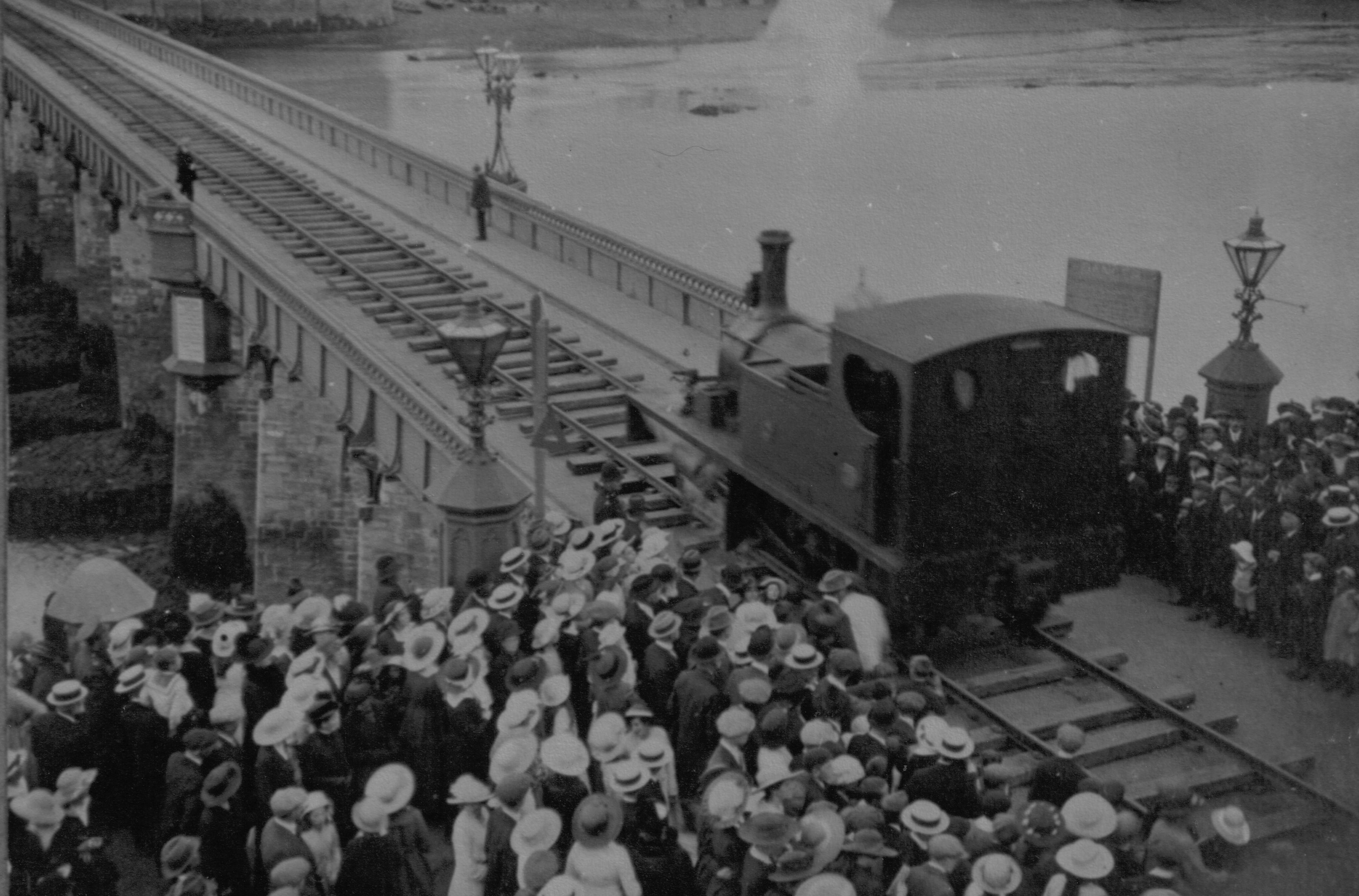
A locomotive crossing the Long Bridge, 1917

Shipping in the form of barges had long passed under the bridge to be carried by the incoming tide 2 miles upstream to Weare Giffard, loaded with stone, sand and sea-coal, and bringing back on the outgoing tide cargos of wood, fuel and corn. Annery kiln was thus situated at the end of the tidal reach and was a destination for cargos of limestone. A proposal was made in the 1820s for the bridge to be converted to a drawbridge which would enable the centre section to be raised to allow masted ships to pass under it upstream. The bridge was widened in 1865 and again in 1925.

== Administration ==
The Bideford Bridge Trust held responsibility for the long bridge until 1968. During the first decade of the 17th century the bridge trustees were taken to court by the townspeople for using the trust's funds "for feasting and seeing plays". The townspeople won the case although it is not known if the trustees were forced to resign. When one of the arches of the bridge collapsed in 1968 the Department of Transport thenceforth assumed responsibility for the bridge. The history of the Bridge and its records is available in a booklet published by the Trust - 'The Long Bridge of Bideford Through the Centuries' by Frank Whiting and Peter Christie

== Accidents ==
In 1886 a Ship called 'Edward Birkbeck' launched from a Bideford shipyard hit the bridge, but only caused small damage by knocking some of the stones out. In 1925 another incident took place on the bridge, during its widening, when a lorry came off the side of the bridge and crashed into the River Torridge; it is believed that both the people in the lorry survived. During the 1968 repair of a collapsed arch a crane toppled over on the bridge and a man was killed.

== World War II ==
During World War II the 10th arch of the bridge was being repaired, the police asked for ladders and scaffolding to be removed from the bridge to prevent potential invaders climbing up and capturing the bridge, during the war the home guard patrolled there.

== See also ==
- List of bridges over River Torridge
