= Ken Arkell =

Canadian football player and judge (1930–2024)

Profile
- Positions: End, tackle

Personal information
- Born: December 6, 1930; Calgary, Alberta, Canada
- Died: August 27, 2024 (aged 93)
- Listed height: 6 ft 5 in (1.96 m)
- Listed weight: 235 lb (107 kg)

Career history
- 1956–1957: BC Lions

Kenneth F. Arkell (December 6, 1930 – August 27, 2024) was a Canadian judge and football player who played for the Ottawa Rough Riders and BC Lions. He played college football at the University of Western Ontario. He was a justice of the Supreme Court of British Columbia from 1990 to 1999. He was a member of the Royal Canadian Mounted Police, a Crown Prosecutor and was the Deputy Chief Judge of the British Columbia Provincial Court during which time he authored the British Columbia Provincial Court Act of 1975. Arkell served for 30 years as judge in the Province of British Columbia. He died on August 27, 2024, at the age of 93.
