= Beam, Great Torrington =

Historic estate in Devon, England

Coordinates: 50.9650°N 4.1764°W

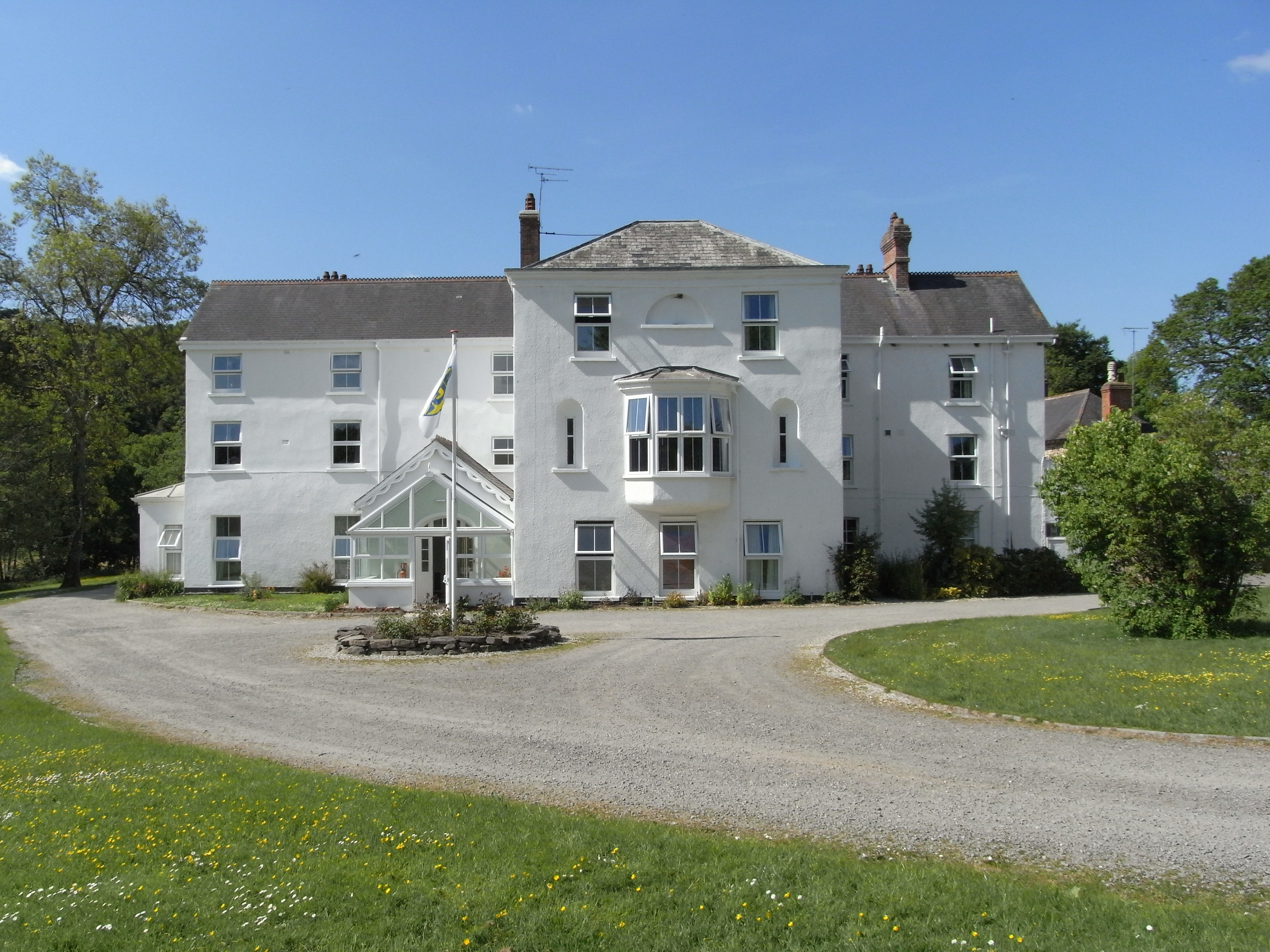
Beam House, Great Torrington, Devon

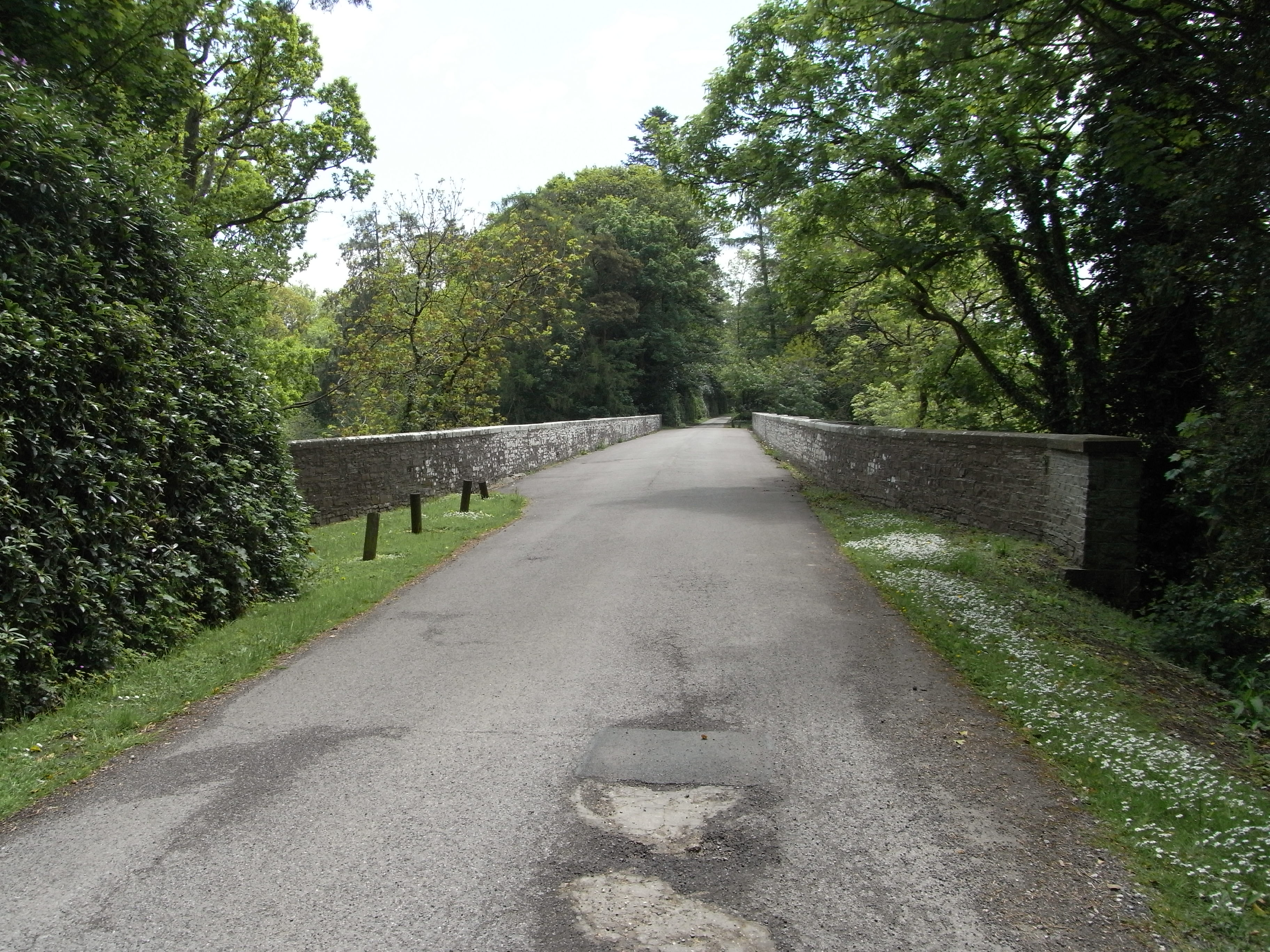
Beam Aqueduct, now viaduct forming commencement of entrance drive to Beam House, beyond to right. View looking south-east, with A386 road behind viewer

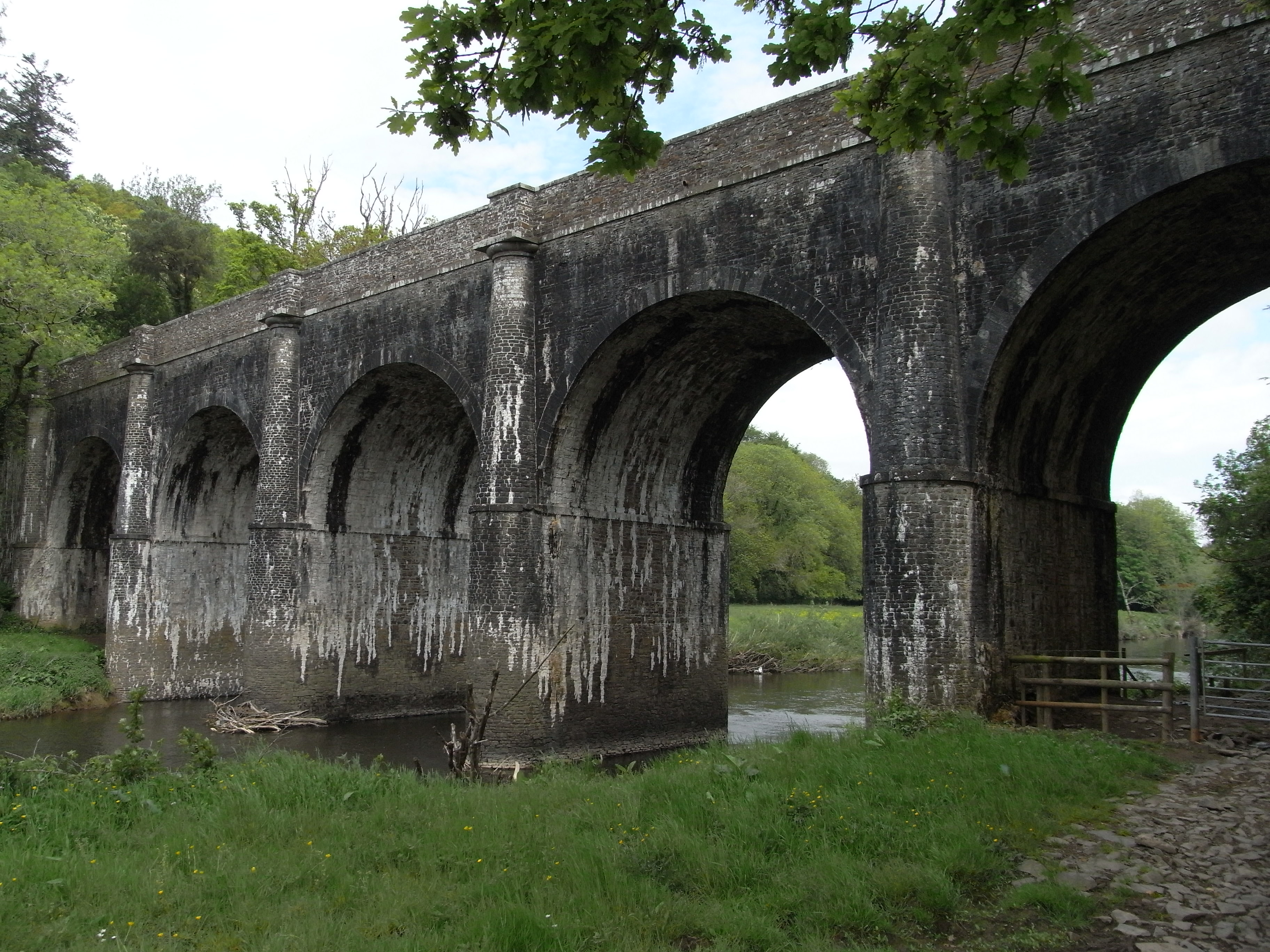
Beam Aqueduct viewed from south

Beam is an historic estate in the parish of Great Torrington, Devon, England. Beam House is situated about 1 1/2 miles north-west and downstream of that town, on the right-bank of the River Torridge. Both the Rolle Canal and the railway crossed the river nearby. It occupies a particularly beautiful setting, described by Lauder (1986) thus: "For lovers of rivers and woodland there can be few lovlier settings for a house than this. Steeply wooded banks shelter the valley and the house is situated on slightly higher ground above lush water meadows, almost completely surrounded by the Torridge" The estate was a subsidiary seat of the Rolle family, lords of the manor of Great Torrington, whose main seat was Stevenstone on the other (south) side of that town and therefore upstream from Beam. It was an outpost of the Royalists during the Civil War. Much of the estate is today owned by Baron Clinton, as heir to the Rolles, but it has had many occupants, including use by the army in both world wars and as a borstal. Tarka the Otter was born at Beam, by what the author Henry Williamson called the "Canal Bridge" (i.e. the Beam Aqueduct) and particularly favoured the River Torridge at Beam Weir. Thus the cycleway which crosses the river at Beam, formerly the railway line, was named the "Tarka Trail", due to its association with these and other haunts of the fictional animal. Today Beam is used as an adventure centre for young people.

== Geography ==
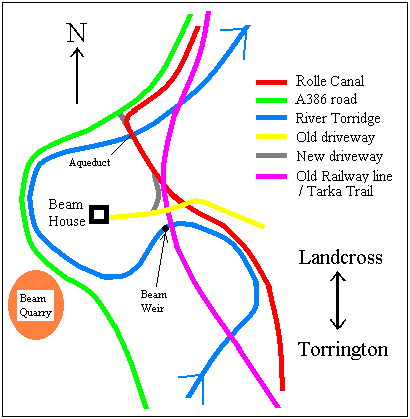
Beam is a crossing-point of several lines of communication. Map of environs of Beam House. Henry Williamson made several references to Beam in his 1927 novel Tarka the Otter including the following descriptive passage: "A quarter of a mile below Rothern Bridge the river slows into the lower loop of a great S. It deepens until half-way, where the S is cut by the weir holding back the waters of the long Beam Pool. Canal Bridge crosses the river at the top of the S"

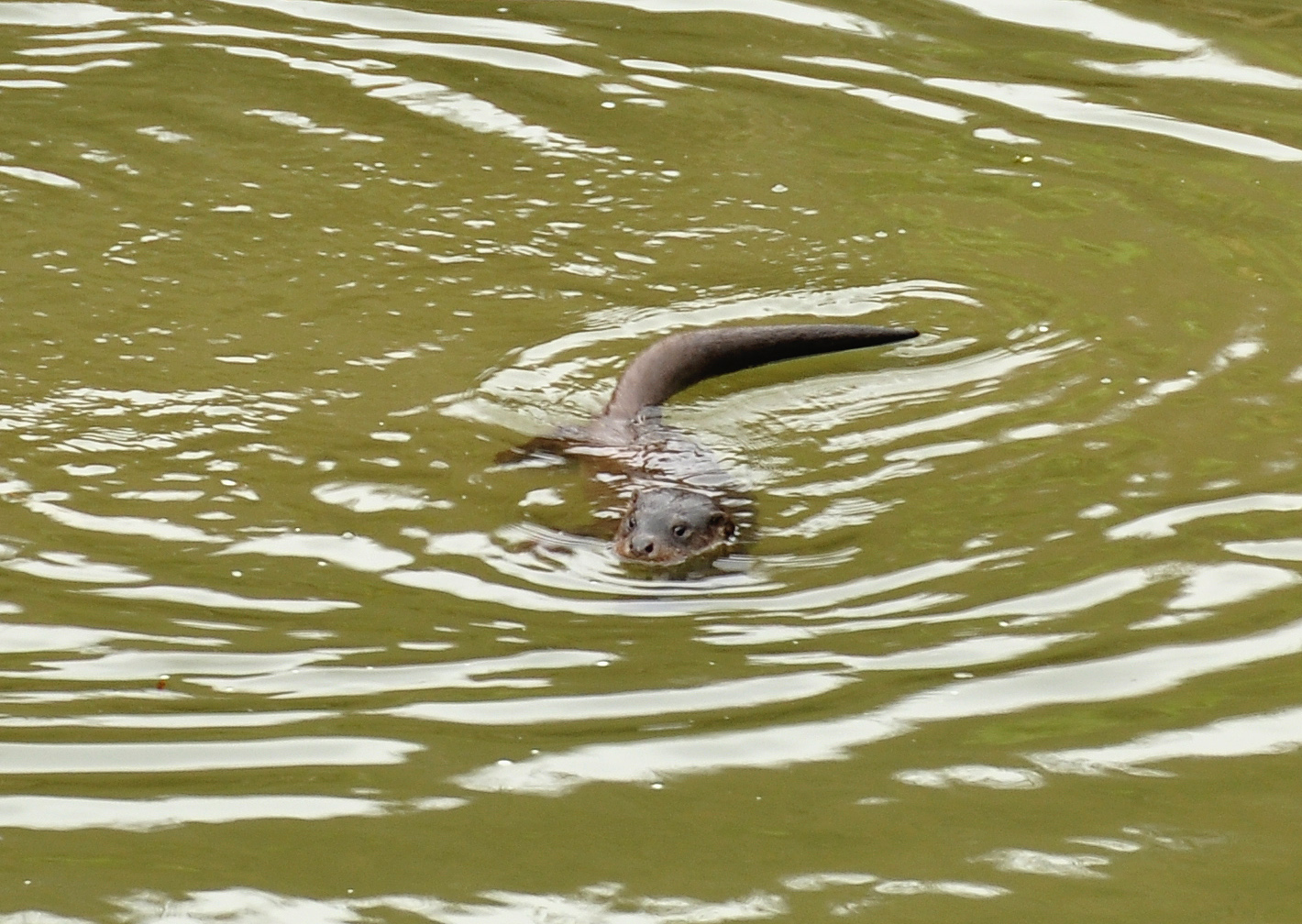
Otter swimming in the River Torridge near Beam, 2011

Beam House is situated about 1 1/2 miles north-west of Great Torrington, on the right-bank of the River Torridge almost encircled by a loop of the river. Beam Quarry is situated within the cliff-like hills on the opposite side of the river from the house. When the Rolle Canal was built by John Rolle, 1st Baron Rolle between that town and the navigable part of the river below Weare Giffard, he chose Beam as the place where the canal was carried by an aqueduct across the River Torridge. The aqueduct was later filled in and is now a viaduct which carries the entrance drive to Beam House from the A386 road. Later the railway crossed the river at a slightly lower place, and continued toward Torrington over the Beam estate.

=== Beam Weir ===
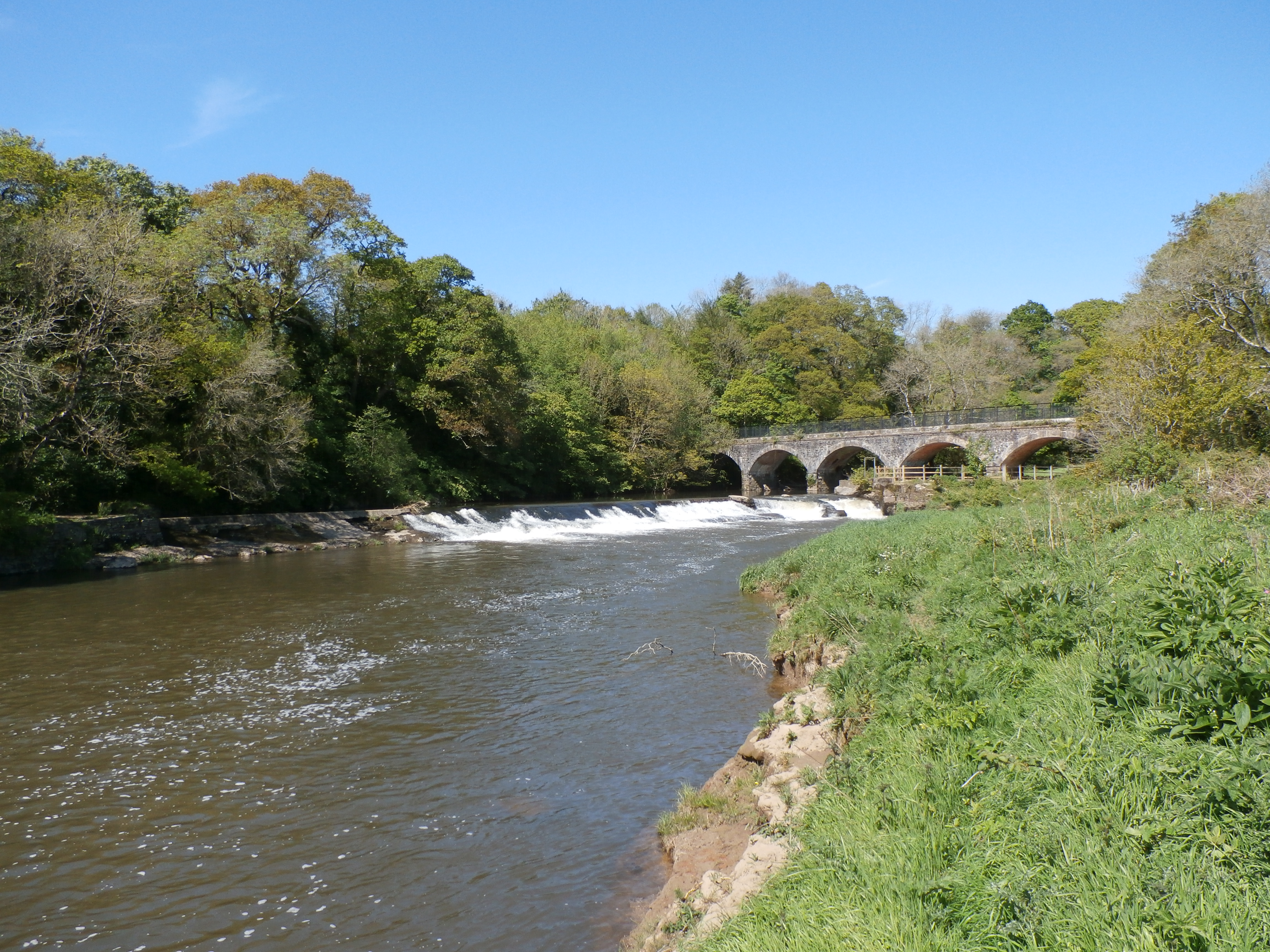
Beam Weir, favoured haunt of Tarka the Otter, with Old Railway Bridge behind (now carrying Tarka Trail cycle-path)

The weir at Beam, situated downstream from Rothern Bridge and upstream of Beam Aqueduct, features in Henry Williamson's novel Tarka the Otter as one of the otter's favoured haunts with its fast running water and languid pools beneath the weir; Below the fish-pass the water rushed in a foamy spate. Above, it slid black and polished (Williamson). It is still today a renowned place for salmon fishing.

== History ==
Beam was for long a subsidiary seat of the Rolle family of nearby Stevenstone, who were latterly lords of the manor of Great Torrington. During the Civil War Beam House was used as an outpost for the Royalist army whose last holding in the West Country was at Great Torrington, lost in 1646 to the Parliamentarian Sir Thomas Fairfax.

During the 18th century, William Rolle (1720–1747) lived here. He was the third son of John Rolle (1679-1730) of Stevenstone and a younger brother of Henry Rolle, 1st Baron Rolle (d.1759). He described himself in his will dated 1747 as "of Beam".

In October 1792 the Devon topographer Rev. John Swete (1752–1821) passed by Beam on his way to Frithelstock and made the following record in his Journal:

... I went in quest of the Priory of Frithelstoke, in the way to which we descended to the bridge at the S.W. end of Torrington, which passing over, we again rose up a steep hill, introducing us to a common precipitous towards the river but having a delightful prospect on the north of 'Beam' a seat of Dennis Rolle Esq., a most lovely and sequestered spot, protected on every side by the richest woods of the finest amphitheatrical form, the roots of which were washed by the river, which, as if enamoured of the spot, winds round it in many a meander and seems reluctant to retire from it.

Another occupant was the Very Rev. Joseph Palmer (1749–1829) Chancellor of Ferns, later Dean of Cashel. He was the author of A four Month Tour Through France (1776). He was the son of John Palmer, of Palmer House, Mayor of Great Torrington, by his wife Mary Reynolds, sister of the painter Sir Joshua Reynolds (1723-1792), and he married Eliza Edwards, daughter of Cadwallader Edwards Esq. of Wexford, Ireland. His monument survives in Exeter Cathedral.

In the later 19th century, the house was occupied by Alfred Robert Hole (1815-1898), Justice of the Peace for Devon and Major, 13th Hussars, North Devon Yeomanry. He was born at Heavitree, Exeter, the son of Major William Hole by his wife Louisa Mallet. He married Elizabeth Mercer (1816-1902), eldest daughter of J. Mercer of Maidstone and Major, 13th Hussars, North Devon Yeomanry. He attended the opening ceremony of the new church of St Giles in the Wood built by Hon. Mark Rolle. He and his wife were buried in Weare Giffard churchyard, where their inscribed monument survives.

=== 20th century ===
Much of the estate surrounding Beam House is owned by Lord Clinton (Clinton Devon Estates), whose family was the heir of Hon. Mark Rolle (d.1907). Lord Clinton's family had long owned the manor of Frithelstock, adjoining Beam on the opposite side of the River Torridge.

During World War I Beam House was used as a convalescence home for injured soldiers. This was possibly the hospital established by William Pethebridge Martin (1859-1935) lord of the manor of Colleton, Chulmleigh (see below). In World War II the house was occupied by the 2nd Battalion, Gloucester Regiment, and was used for training in clandestine operations. In the 1950s Beam was used for ten years as a borstal, and then as an educational establishment, when a new accommodation block was built.

In 1959 Beam was the home of Philip Michael Pethebridge Martin, High Sheriff of Devon in that year. He was the third son of William Pethebridge Martin (1859-1935) of Colleton and of New South Wales in Australia, by his wife Maude Price daughter of William Price of Sydney, NSW. William had founded the Sydney wool-brokerage firm W.P. Martin & Co, but later moved to Devon, where he purchased and resided at Colleton Manor near Chulmleigh, and was lord of the manor of Chulmleigh. He was High Sheriff of Devon 1918-19, and Master of the Eggesford Foxhounds. With his partner Harry Austin, William equipped a hospital for soldiers during WW I, possibly at Beam House, which he later donated to the municipal council as a children's hospital. He died at Colleton in 1935.

In the 1970s a Mr Osbourne of Barnstaple purchased the property and used it as the base for the "Kingsley Adventure Centre". The operation was then taken over by Quest Adventure Centres, which business failed and was purchased by PGL Travel Ltd which, as of 2013, continues to operate the site under lease from the Osbourne family as an adventure centre providing holidays for young people.

In 2024 PGL closed the adventure centre. The property is still empty at October 2025.
