= Tarka the Otter =

1927 novel by Henry Williamson

Tarka the Otter: His Joyful Water-Life and Death in the Country of the Two Rivers
- First edition; woodcut after Hester Sainsbury
- Author: Henry Williamson
- Subject: European otter
- Genre: Natural history novel
- Publisher: G. P. Putnam's Sons
- Publication date: 1927
- Publication place: England
- Awards: Hawthornden Prize (1927)
- OCLC: 459048074
- LC Class: PZ10.3.W678 Ta 2
- Text: Tarka the Otter: His Joyful Water-Life and Death in the Country of the Two Rivers at Wikisource

Tarka the Otter: His Joyful Water Life and Death in the Country of the Two Rivers is a novel by the English writer Henry Williamson written between June 1923 and February 1927. Williamson privately published an edition limited to 100 copies in August 1927, and the first ordinary edition was published by G. P. Putnam's Sons with an introduction by Sir John Fortescue in October that year. The book won the Hawthornden Prize in 1927, and has never been out of print.

The novel describes the life of an otter, along with a detailed observation of its habitat in the country of the River Taw and River Torridge in north Devon (the "Two Rivers"); the name "Tarka" is said by Williamson to mean "Wandering as Water" (p. 10). Although not written for children, the book soon became popular with young readers, and also influenced literary figures as diverse as Ted Hughes and Rachel Carson.

== Plot summary and style ==
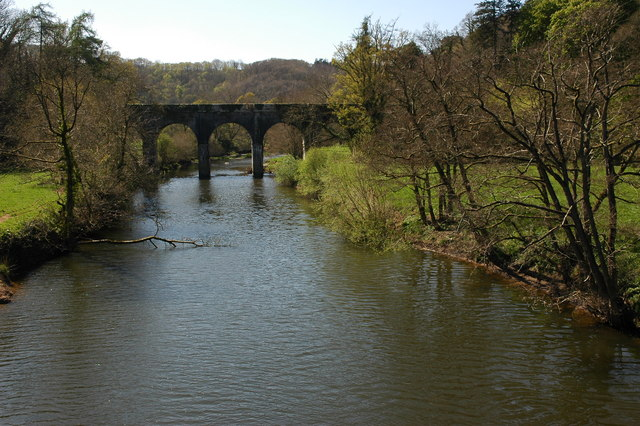
The Beam Aqueduct, the "Canal Bridge" near which Tarka was born

The book is separated into two main parts, "The First Year" and "The Last Year". It begins shortly before the birth of Tarka in an otter holt on the River Torridge, near the Rolle Canal aqueduct on the Beam estate. After a period learning to swim and hunt, and losing a sibling in a trap, he is separated from his mother and wanders around north Devon alone. His first mate is an elderly otter called Greymuzzle, who is killed during Tarka's first winter, which is unusually harsh. In his second year, he fathers a litter of cubs with his second mate, White-tip. Throughout the book Williamson juxtaposes Tarka with his main enemy, the local otter hunt, and particularly the pied otterhound Deadlock, "the truest marking-hound in the country of the Two Rivers" (p. 23). The book ends with a climactic nine-hour hunt of Tarka by the pack, and a confrontation between Tarka and Deadlock. Williamson's attitude to the hunt is somewhat ambivalent: while admiring them for their own regard for and knowledge of the otter, and despite being personally friendly with his local hunt, the violence and cruelty of some of his descriptions of hunting is clear.

Locations featured in the book include Braunton Burrows, the clay pits at Marland, Morte Point, Hoar Oak Water and the Chains. The book begins and ends in the vicinity of Torrington.

Williamson wrote with a descriptive style which some, such as Ted Hughes, have characterised as poetic: in his memorial address for Williamson, quoted by Roger Deakin in his book Waterlog, Hughes described him as "one of the truest English poets of his generation". His writing is also characterised by a lack of sentimentality about the animals it describes; Williamson is generally careful to avoid anthropomorphising them and rarely attempts to present any but their most basic or instinctual mental processes.

== History and reception ==
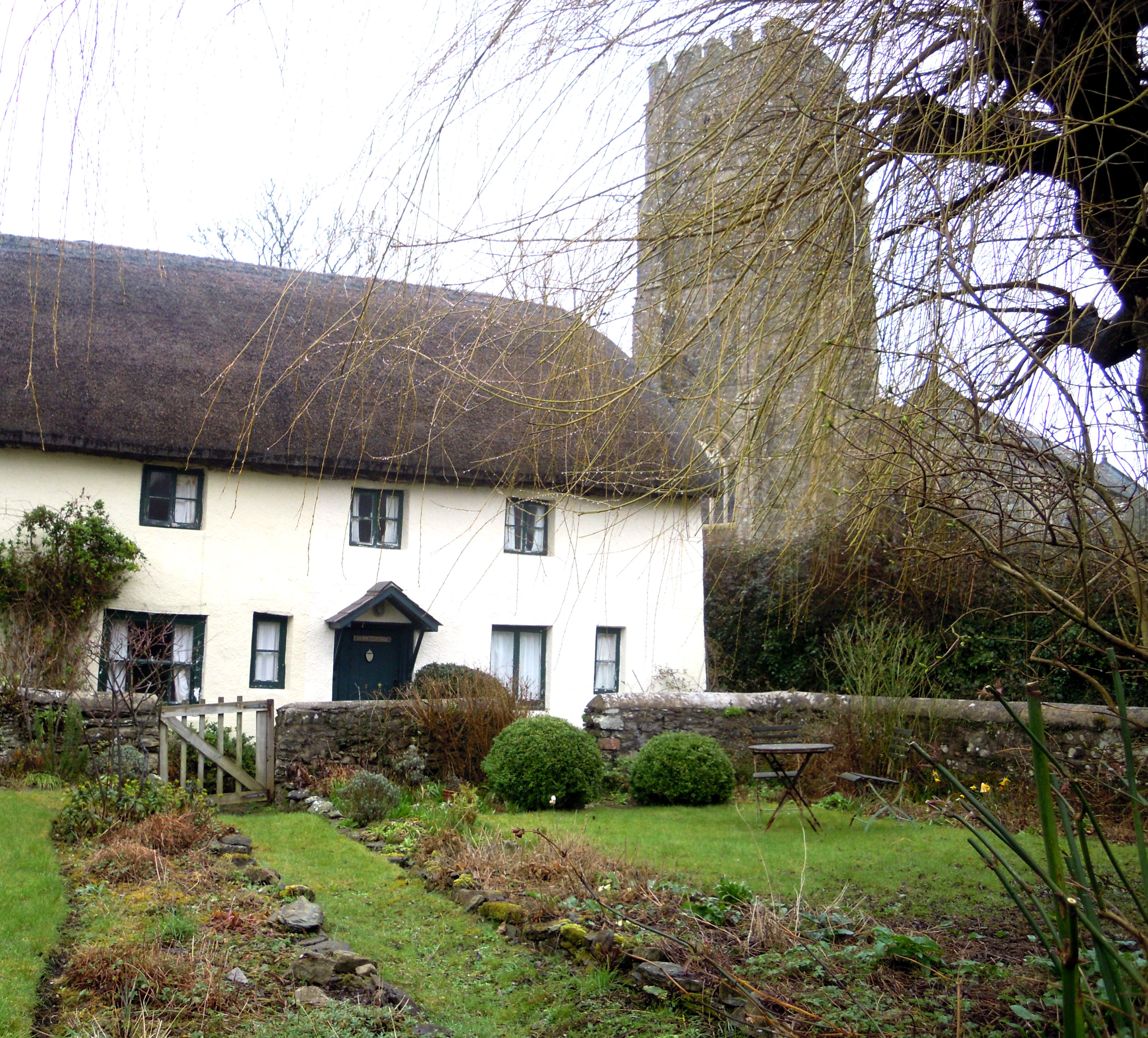
Williamson began writing Tarka the Otter in Skirr Cottage, Georgeham, Devon, where he lived from 1921 to 1925

Williamson, who was born in London and had moved to Georgeham, Devon, in 1921, began making notes for Tarka about two years later: although he was usually a rather rapid writer, the book took him around four years to write thanks to the large amount of detailed research needed. Williamson often claimed that he was inspired to write Tarka after rescuing and raising an otter cub, but the truth of this story is uncertain and it seems likely that the 1909 book The Life Story of an Otter, by Cornish naturalist John Coulson Tregarthen, was a more substantial influence. Nevertheless, Williamson spent a great deal of time gathering information on otters' habits and behaviour.

The original edition featured illustrations by Charles Tunnicliffe. The book was extremely well-received on publication, attracting praise from Thomas Hardy and T. E. Lawrence, amongst others. Although not written for children, the book soon became popular with young readers. The book led novelist John Galsworthy to describe Williamson as “the finest and most intimate living interpreter of the drama of wild life”.

== Influence ==
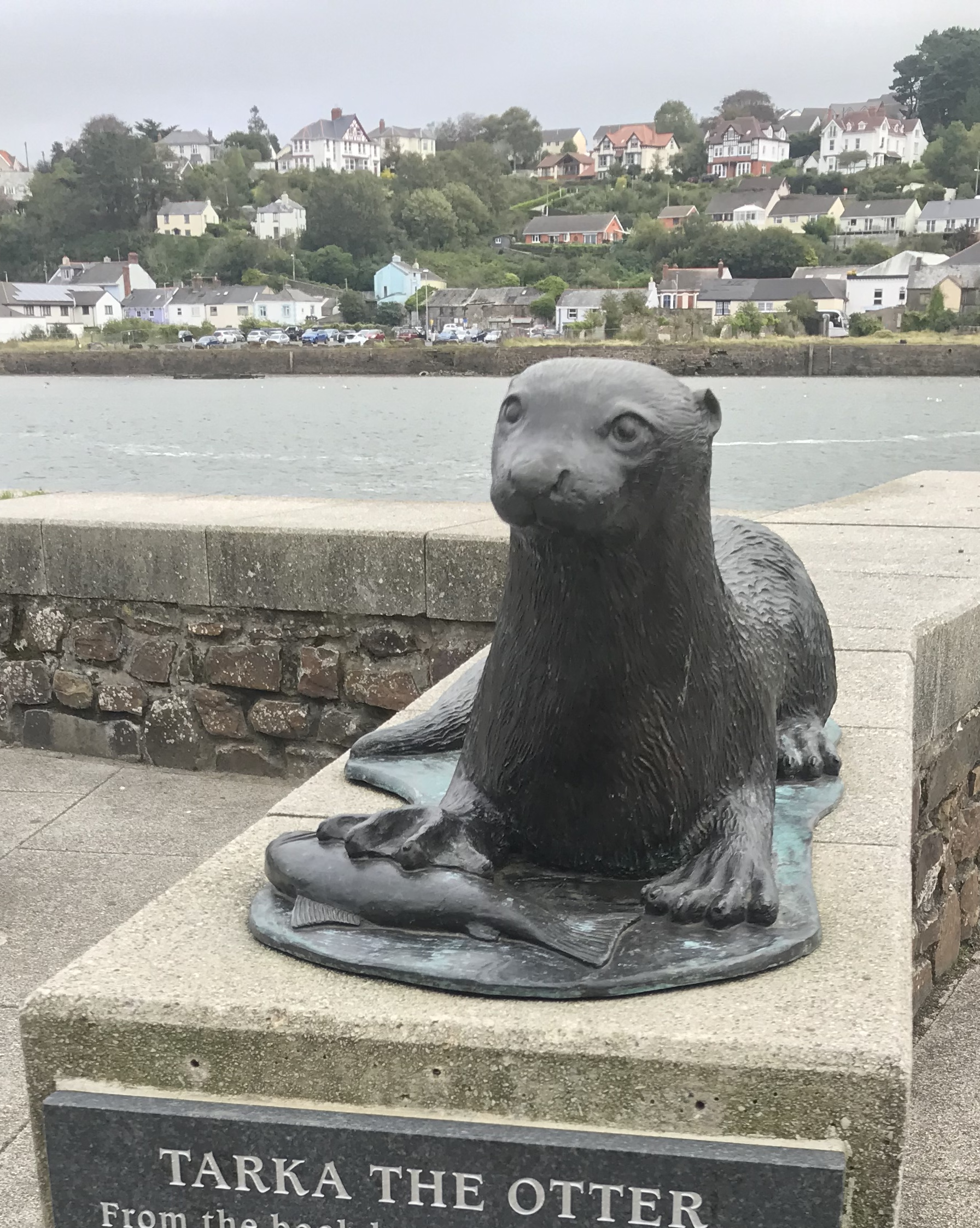
Sculpture of Tarka the Otter in Bideford, next to the River Torridge; sculpted by Rowan Fawdon

Tarka has been an influential work. American writer Rachel Carson once wrote that Williamson's work had "deeply influenced" her and said that Tarka the Otter and Salar the Salmon would be two of three books she might take to a desert island. Ted Hughes, who later became friends with an elderly Williamson, repeatedly cited reading the book as an important experience for him, while the author Roger Deakin wrote that he admired the "beauty and ice-clear accuracy" of Williamson's writing and described Tarka as a "great mythic poem".

Others to whom the book was significant included the nature writers Kenneth Allsop and Denys Watkins-Pitchford ('BB'), who described it as "the greatest animal story ever written".

At the time the book was published, otters were generally regarded as vermin, but Tarka (and more specifically its later film adaptation) is credited with inspiring a transformation in public attitudes to otters. The book remains well-known, and is often used to promote the area of North Devon where it is set. The Tarka Line railway line to Barnstaple, and Tarka Trail long distance footpath and cycle path, are named after the book. The book has lent its name to the Tarka Country Trust, a registered charity.

== Audiobook ==
In 1978 Sir David Attenborough narrated an audiobook version of the story, released as a double audio cassette.

== Film adaptation ==
The novel has been adapted into a film, Tarka the Otter. In 1974, Williamson began working on a script for a film treatment of the novel, but it was not regarded as suitable to film. Having previously rejected two offers from Walt Disney, Williamson finally accepted an offer to make the film from English wildlife documentary film-maker David Cobham, whom he trusted.

The film, narrated by Peter Ustinov, was released in 1979, with a screenplay by Gerald Durrell. One of Williamson's sons, Richard, and his daughter-in-law appear in the film. It was voted the 98th greatest family film in a Channel 4 poll. The soundtrack for the film was composed by David Fanshawe and performed by Tommy Reilly.

== Notable editions ==
- 1927, UK, G. P. Putnam's Sons, October 1927, Hardback
- 1937, UK, Penguin Books, Paperback
- 1962, UK, Revised edition, Puffin Books, Paperback
- 1965, UK, Bodley Head, 1965, Hardback
- 1971, UK, Puffin Books ISBN 0-14-030060-0, January 1971, Paperback (C.F. Tunnicliffe, Illustrator)
- 1981, US, Nelson Thornes ISBN 0-333-30602-3, March 1981, Hardcover (C.F. Tunnicliffe, Illustrator)
- 1982, US, Salem House Publishers ISBN 0-370-30919-7, 1982, Paperback
- 1990, US, Beacon Press ISBN 0-8070-8507-3, 1990, Paperback (Concord Library Series)
- 1995, UK, Puffin Books ISBN 0-14-036621-0, June 1995, Paperback (Annabel Large, Illustrator)
- 2009, UK, Penguin Modern Classics ISBN 0-141-19035-3, Paperback (Jeremy Gavron, Introduction)
