= Charles Arkell =

Charles Swynfren Carnegie Arkell (1905–1968) was an Anglican priest.

Arkell was educated at the Australian College of Theology. He was ordained deacon in 1929, and priest in 1930. After a curacy in Ipswich he joined the Bush Brotherhood. Arkell served at Charleville, Gin Gin and Keppel. During World War II he served with the AIF as a Chaplain. On 7 April 1941 he was captured at Derna, Libya by the Afrika Korps with the 2/15th Battalion (Australia). When peace returned he became Rector of Sherwood. He was Archdeacon of Lilley from 1963 to 1968.
