= Marland Works railway station =

Railway station in Torridge, Devon, England

Coordinates: 50°53′30″N 4°07′53″W

Marland Works
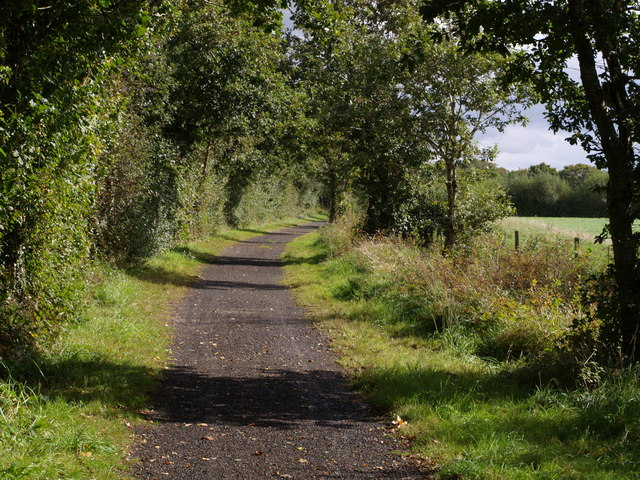
- Trackbed of the old line.

General information
- Location: Peters Marland Ball clay works, Torridge; England
- Grid reference: SS507118
- Platforms: One

Other information
- Status: Disused

History
- Pre-grouping: Torrington and Marland Railway(1881 -1925); North Devon and Cornwall Junction Light Railway (1925 to 1948)

Key dates
- ?: Opened
- ?: Closed
Location

Marlands Works was a busy industrial site for just over a century, firstly on the Torrington and Marland Railway, built to carry bricks and clay on a gauge of 3 ft (914 mm), which in turn was subsumed in 1925 by the North Devon and Cornwall Junction Light Railway before finally becoming part of the Southern Region of British Railways in 1948. The line closed to passenger traffic in 1965 as part of the Beeching reforms but the line remained open for freight between Barnstaple railway station and Torrington until 1982. Today it forms part of the popular Tarka trail, although an important site for industrial railway historians too. Marland Works station was used by workmen only and was not in public passenger use.

== See also ==
- List of closed railway stations in Britain
