= Myles Arkell =

English cricketer & schoolmaster (1932–2021)

Personal information
- Full name: Richard Henry Myles Arkell
- Born: 16 June 1932; Northampton, England
- Died: 2 September 2021 (aged 89)
- Batting: Right-handed
- Bowling: Slow left-arm orthodox

Domestic team information
- Years: Team
- 1953–1955: Cambridge University
- FC debut: 9 May 1953 Cambridge University v Free Foresters
- Last FC: 11 May 1955 Cambridge University v Leicestershire

Career statistics
Competition	First-class
Matches	3
Runs scored	18
Batting average	4.50
100s/50s	0/0
Top score	10
Balls bowled	270
Wickets	6
Bowling average	20.83
5 wickets in innings	0
10 wickets in match	0
Best bowling	3/39
Catches/stumpings	0/–
- Source: ESPNcricinfo, 23 January 2009

Richard Henry Myles Arkell (16 June 1932 – 2 September 2021) was an English cricketer and schoolmaster.

He was born 16 June 1932 at Abington in Northampton. After National Service, he went to King's College, Cambridge. He played in three first-class matches for Cambridge University between 1953 and 1955.

He joined the staff of St Edward's School, Oxford, in 1955, where he taught History and English. He also became master in charge of cricket and master in charge of hockey. He retired from the school in 1990. He died on 2 September 2021.
