= Weitzel =

Weitzel is a surname. Notable people with the surname include:

- August Willem Philip Weitzel (1816–1896), military officer, Dutch Minister of War
- Brad Weitzel, American baseball player, scout, coach, and author
- Camilla Weitzel (born 2000), German volleyball player
- Frank Weitzel (1905–1932), New Zealand printmaker and artist
- Fritz Weitzel (1904–1940), German SS commander during the Nazi era
- George T. Weitzel (1873–1936), Envoy Extraordinary and Minister Plenipotentiary to Nicaragua
- Godfrey Weitzel (1835–1884), German-American major general in the Union army during the American Civil War
- Hedwig Weitzel or Hedwig Ross (1900–1971), New Zealand-born Australian educator and political activist
- John Quinn Weitzel M.M. (1928–2022), American Roman Catholic bishop of Samoa-Pago Pago, American Samoa
- Louise Adeline Weitzel (1862–1934), American writer of German descent
- Willi Weitzel (born 1972), German television presenter, journalist and film producer

== See also ==
- Weitzel Lock, parallel locks that enable ships to travel between Lake Superior and the lower Great Lakes
- Weitz
- Wetzel (disambiguation)
- Wettzell (disambiguation)
- Wetzell
- Witzel (disambiguation)
