= Linocut =

Printmaking technique

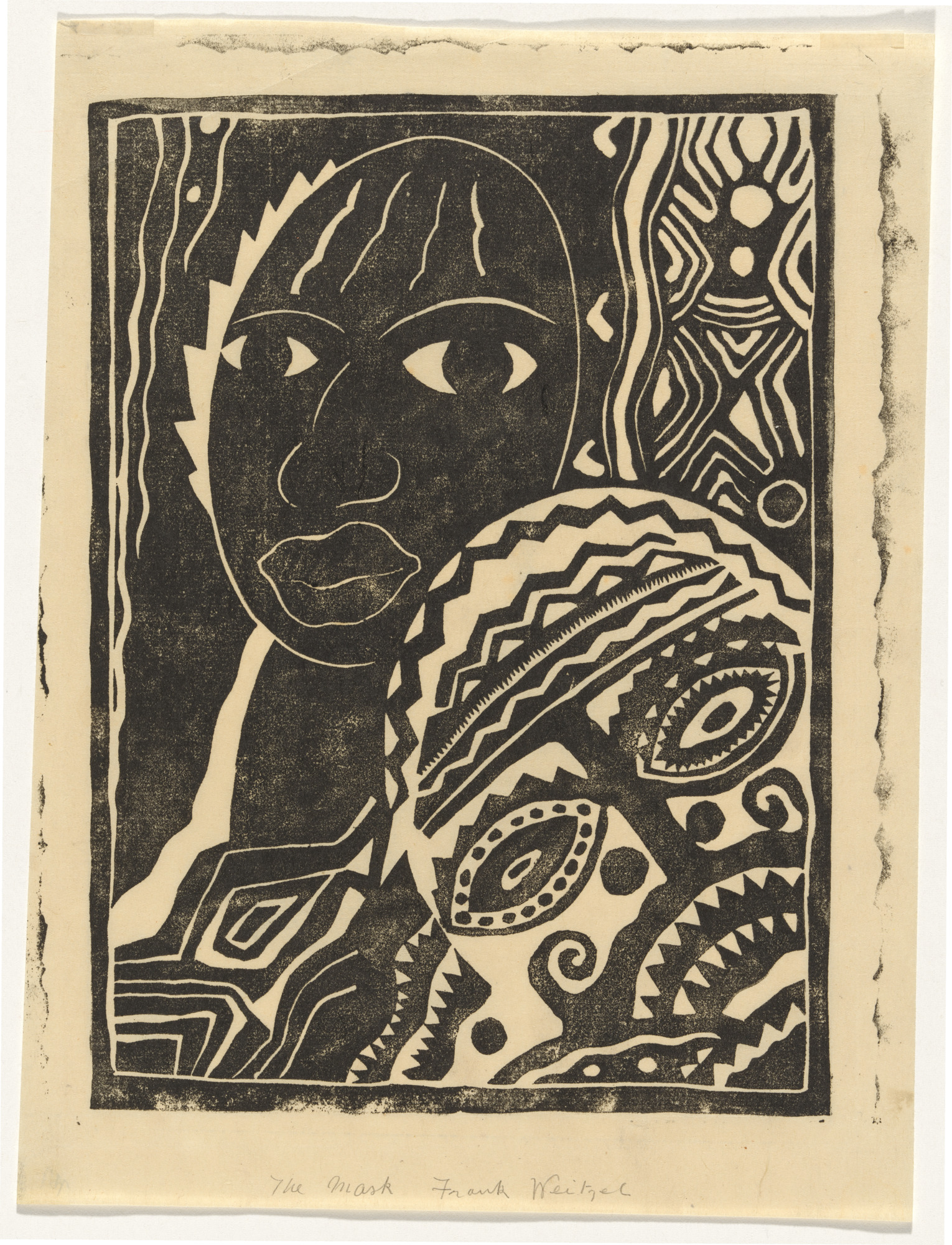
The Mask by Frank Weitzel, 1930

Linocut, also known as lino print, lino printing or linoleum art, is a printmaking technique, a variant of relief printing in which a sheet of linoleum (sometimes mounted on a wooden block) is used for a relief surface. A design is cut into the linoleum surface with a sharp knife, V-shaped chisel or gouge, with the raised (uncarved) areas representing a reversal (mirror image) of the parts to show printed. The linoleum sheet is inked with a roller (called a brayer), and then impressed onto paper or fabric. The actual printing can be done by hand or with a printing press.

Multi-color linocuts can be made by successively printing with a different block for each color, as in a color woodcut, as the artists of the Grosvenor School frequently did. As Pablo Picasso demonstrated, such prints can also be achieved using a single piece of linoleum in what is called the "reductive" print method. Essentially, after each successive color is imprinted on the paper, the artist cleans the lino plate and cuts away what will not be imprinted for the next color.

== Technique ==
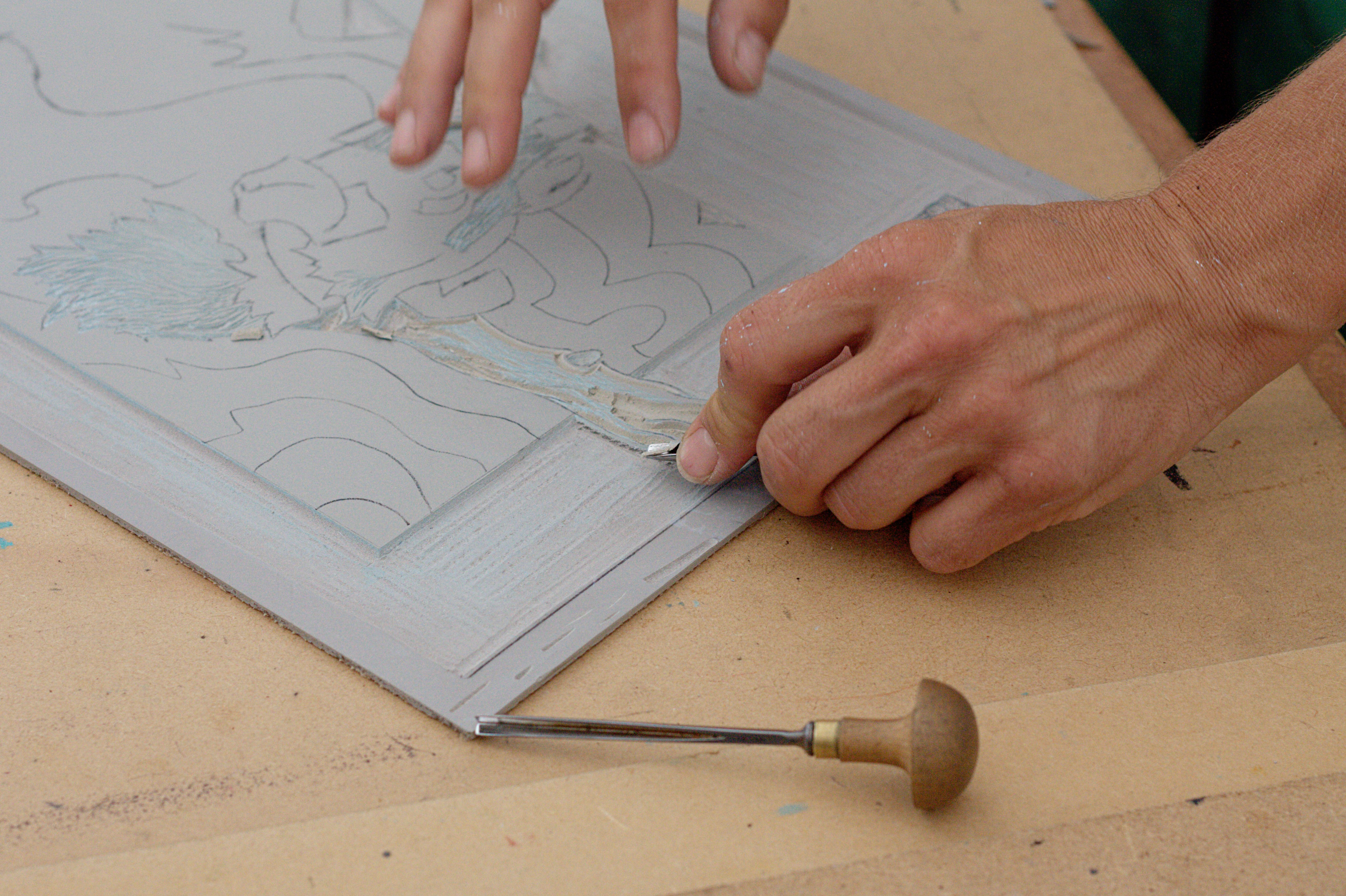
Using a handheld gouger to cut a design into linoleum for a linocut print

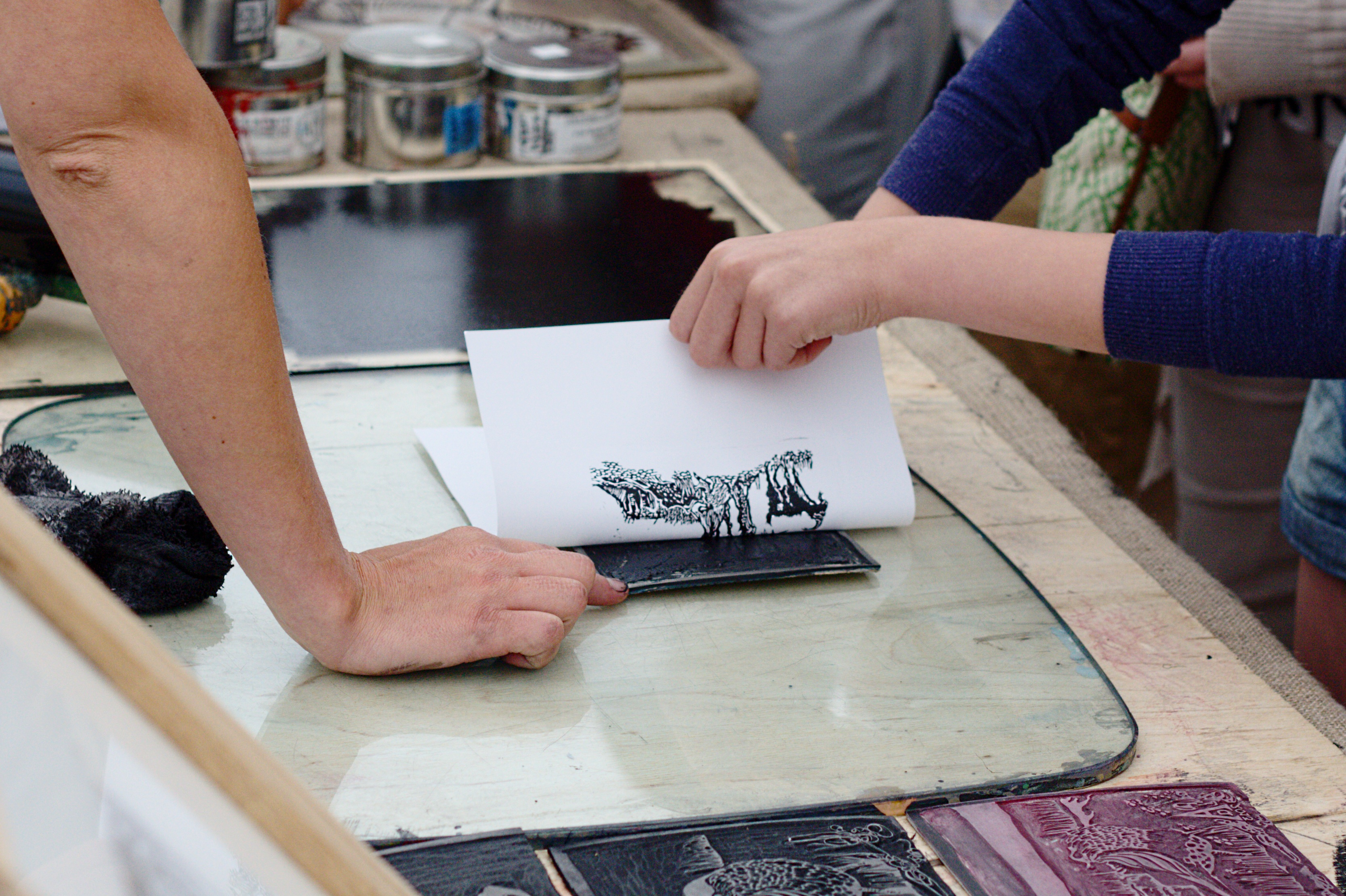
Linocut printing; using a design cut into linoleum to make a print on paper

Since the material being carved has no directional grain and does not tend to split, it is easier to obtain certain artistic effects with lino than with most woods, although the resultant prints lack the often angular grainy character of woodcuts. Lino is generally much easier to cut than wood, especially when heated, but the pressure of the printing process degrades the plate faster and it is difficult to create larger works due to the material's lack of rigidity.

Because of its ease of use, linocut is widely used in schools to introduce children to the art of printmaking, allowing them to complete many tasks in the art lesson rather than reaching for the pencil and eraser. Similarly, non-professional artists often cut lino rather than wood for printing. Nevertheless, in the contemporary art world, the linocut is an established professional print medium because of its extensive use by artists of the Expressionist art movement, the Grosvenor School, and by Pablo Picasso and Henri Matisse.

== Emergence of the technique in the United States ==
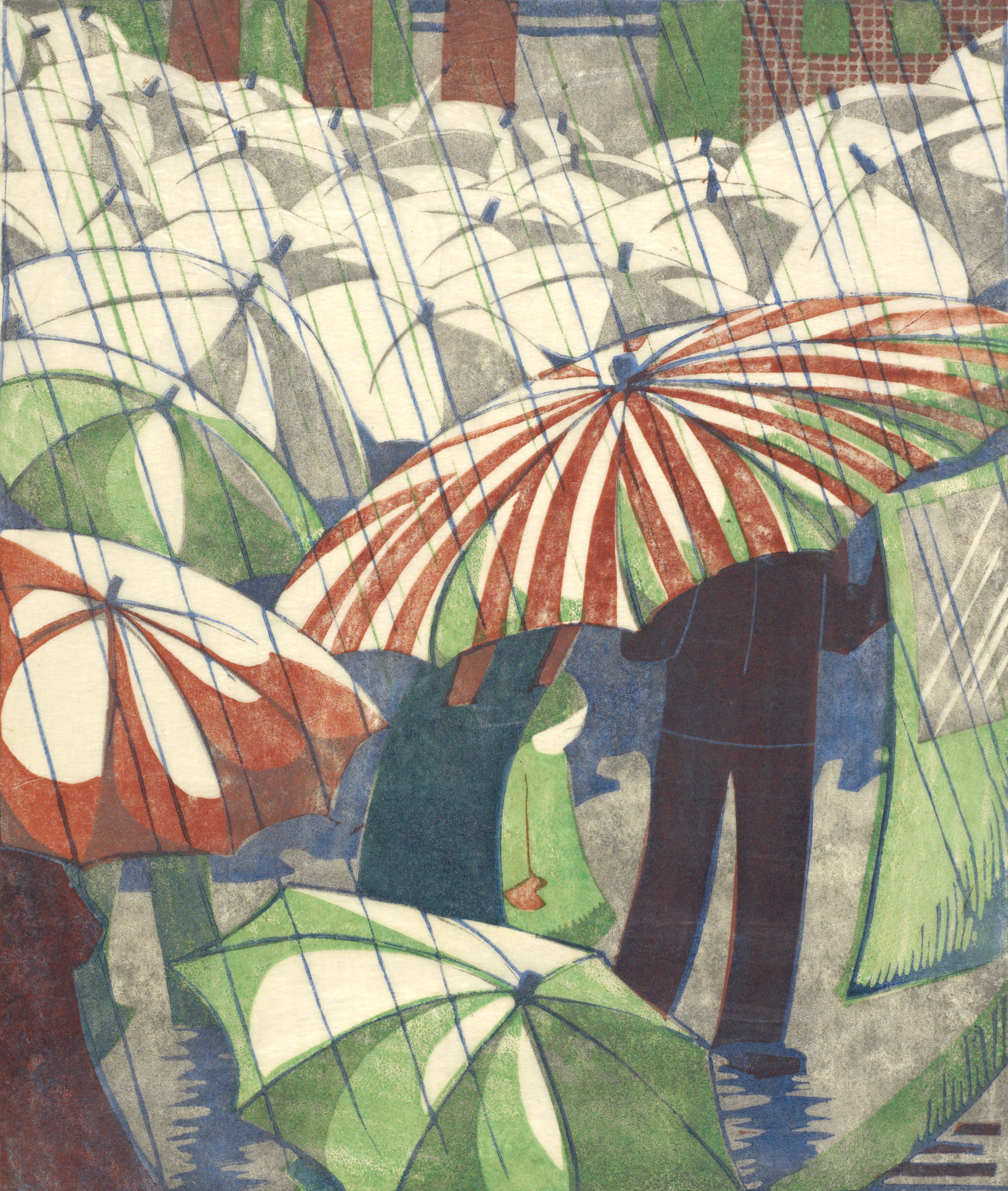
Wet Afternoon, linocut in four color blocks by Ethel Spowers of the Grosvenor School group, 1930.

"Linoleum art" was first displayed in New York City in 1911 by the Czech émigré Vojtěch Preissig. In his publications on linocuts (1926–29) the respected American printmaker, Pedro Joseph de Lemos, simplified the methods for art schools and introduced new techniques for color linocuts, including the printing of the key block first. The first large-scale color linocuts made by an American artist were created c. 1943–45 by Walter Inglis Anderson, and exhibited at the Brooklyn Museum in 1949.

== Selected artists ==
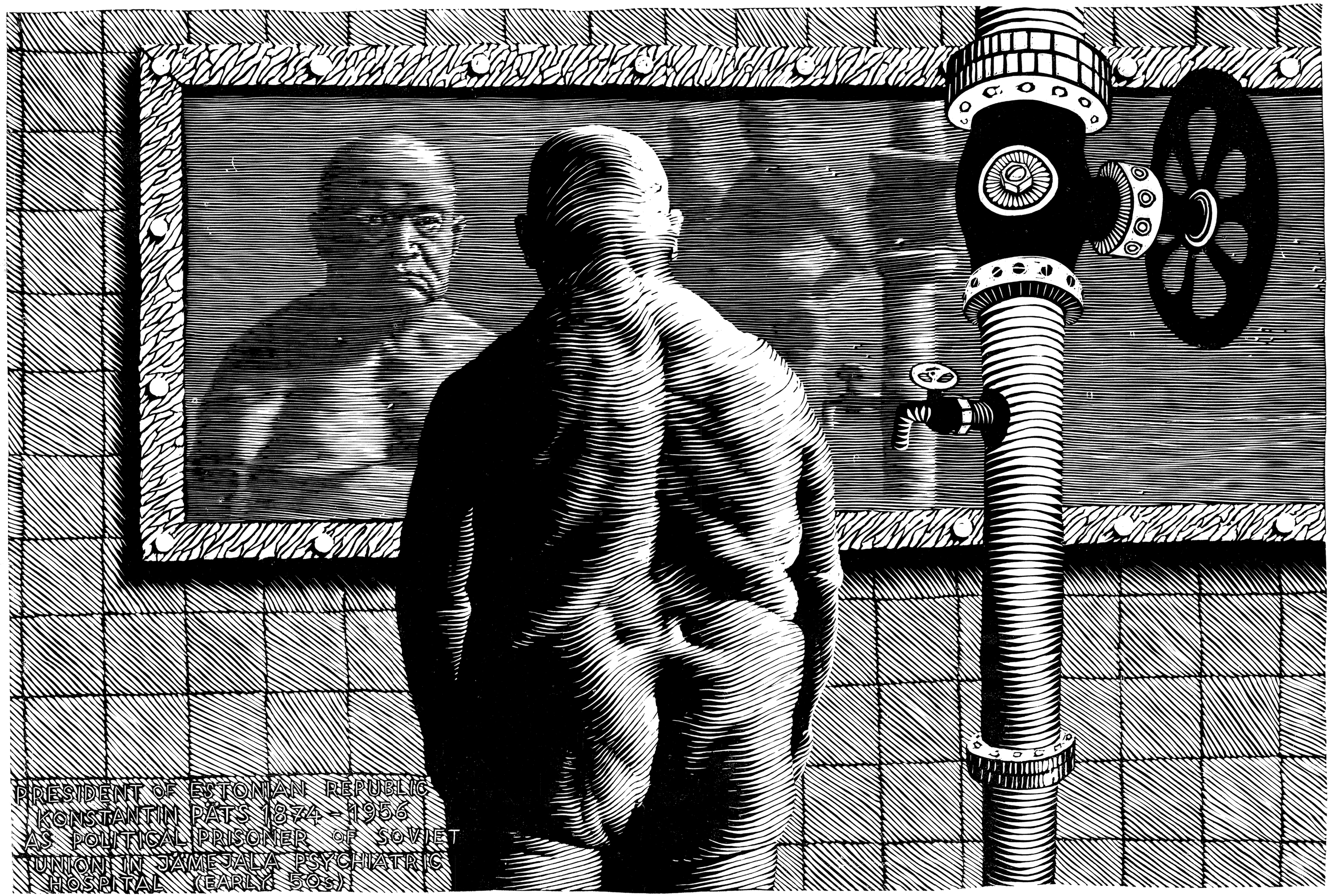
Born in the Soviet Union. Linocut by Peeter Allik.

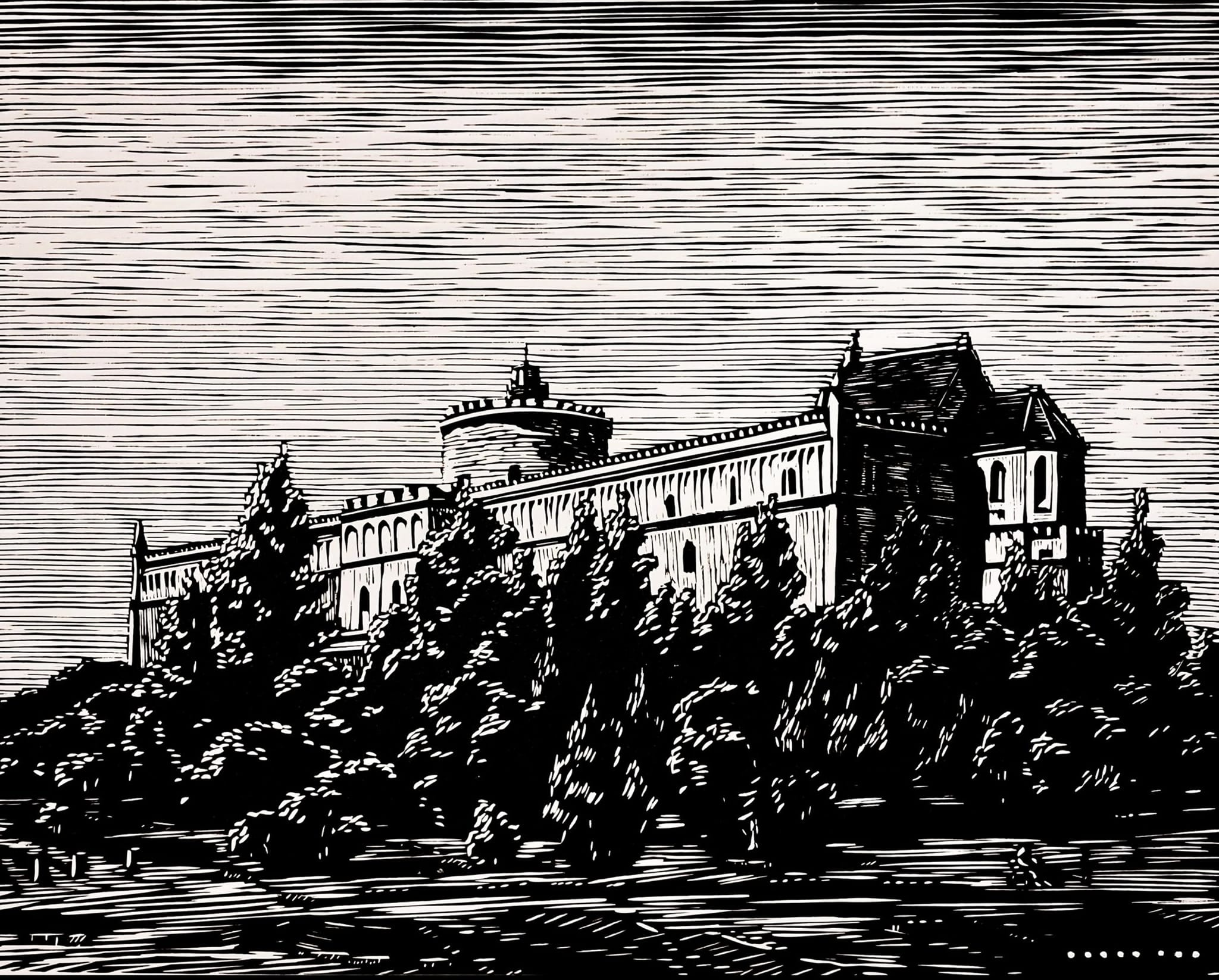
Lublin Castle. Linocut on paper by Paweł Brodzisz, 37 × 47 cm.

- Josef Albers, German
- Peeter Allik, Estonian
- Valenti Angelo, American printmaker and illustrator
- Walter Inglis Anderson American
- Sybil Andrews English-Canadian
- Hans Anton Aschenborn, German
- Torsten Billman, Swedish
- Emma Bormann, Austrian
- Gail Brodholt, English
- Horace Brodzky, Australian/British artist
- Angel Botello, Spanish-Puerto Rican artist
- Margaret Burroughs, American artist
- Elizabeth Catlett, Mexican American artist
- Carlos Cortez, American poet and artist
- David Call, American Deaf artist
- Stanley Donwood, British artist
- Yvonne Drewry, English artist
- Janet Doub Erickson, American printmaker and artist
- M. C. Escher, Dutch artist
- Bill Fick, American printmaker and illustrator
- Folly Cove Designers American design collective
- Angela Harding, English artist
- Jacques Hnizdovsky, Ukrainian/American
- William Kermode, Australian
- Gaga Kovenchuk, Russian
- Henri Matisse, French painter
- Pablo Picasso, Spanish painter
- Cyril Edward Power, English artist
- Everett Ruess, American
- Karl Schmidt-Rottluff, German printmaker and painter
- John Shaw, American/Canadian painter and printmaker
- Irena Sibley, Australian
- James Blanding Sloan, American
- Ethel Spowers, Australian printmaker
- Ken Sprague, English artist
- Frank Weitzel, New Zealand
- Hannah Tompkins, American
- Tom Hazelmyer, American
- Gwen Frostic, American
- Vanessa Lubach, British
- Paweł Brodzisz, Polish artist
- Chittaprosad Bhattacharya, Indian

== See also ==
- Block printing
- Gyotaku
- Rubber stamp
- Woodcut
