= Frank Weitzel =

New Zealand artist (1905–1932)

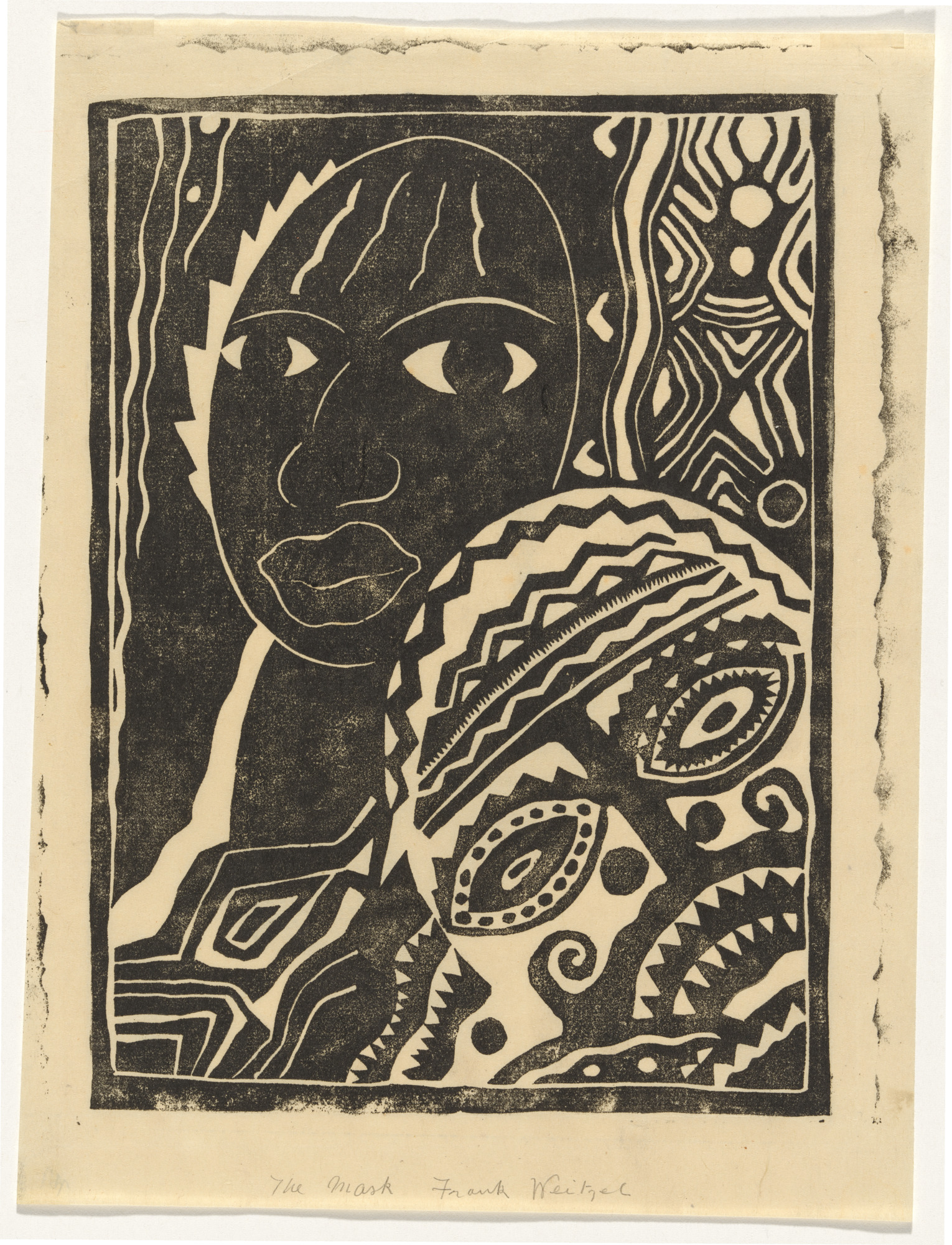
The Mask, linocut by Frank Weitzel, 1930

Frank Weitzel (22 November 1905 – 22 February 1932) was a linocut printmaker and sculptor from New Zealand, who studied in San Francisco and Munich before moving to Sydney and then London. A promising artist, he died of tetanus on the cusp of his first solo show at the age of 26.

== Early life and education ==
Weitzel was born in Levin on 22 November 1905 to naturalised German parents Maria Benninghoven and her husband Frederick Gustav Weitzel, a brass founder; his older sister was the teacher and Communist Hedwig Weitzel. By 1912 the family were living in Wellington, where Weitzel grew up. They were also socialists and political radicals: the family home on Buller Street was a meeting place for anti-militarists and communists. During World War One their German name and their anti-conscription sympathies led to the family being viewed with suspicion, and Weitzel's father was interned on Matui / Somes Island as an enemy alien, despite being a naturalised New Zealand citizen since 1902. After his father's death, Weitzel's mother took in boarders and became increasingly angry at the New Zealand authorities; she applied unsuccessfully to be repatriated to Germany, and in 1921 moved to San Francisco with Frank (was 16 and had just begun attending art classes) and another of her children.

Weitzel enrolled in high school, and in 1923 won a three-year scholarship to attend the California School of Fine Arts. He studied sculpture under Bert Mangard, textile design, and drawing (winning first and second prizes for all three), and was influenced by Pre-Columbian sculpture. Weitzel began exhibiting his sculptures in 1925, and won an national art scholarship, competing against hundreds of older students, which allowed him to attend the Art Students League of New York in 1926, and to travel to Germany in 1927 to study at the Munich Academy. After travelling in Europe in 1928 he moved to Sydney that same year to join his family, who had relocated there.

== Artistic career ==
Wietzel began practising linocut at this time. He became a part of Sydney's art circle, creating monochrome linocuts of Sydney streets and building sites, more abstract than literal. One example is Sydney Bridge (c. 1929) which depicted the geometry of construction girders used in the building of Sydney Harbour Bridge. Weitzel's work brought him to the attention of the modernist artists Adrien Feint and Thea Proctor, who invited him to join the Contemporary Group, and one of his works and a short biography appeared in Art in Australia in September 1929. In December he contributed wall hangings in the Bauhaus style to the Burdekin House exhibition of Antique and Modern Furniture.

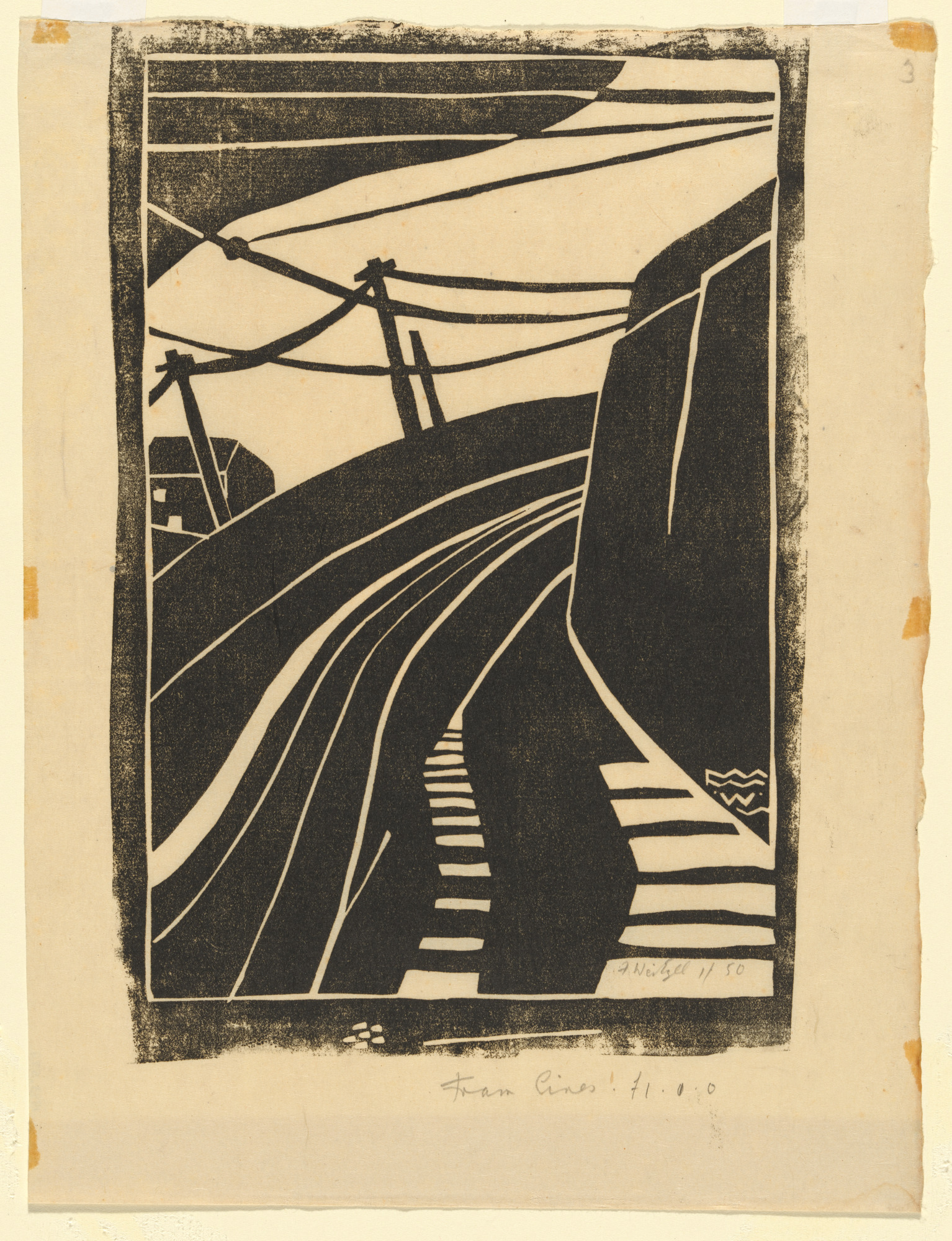
Tram Lines (1928)

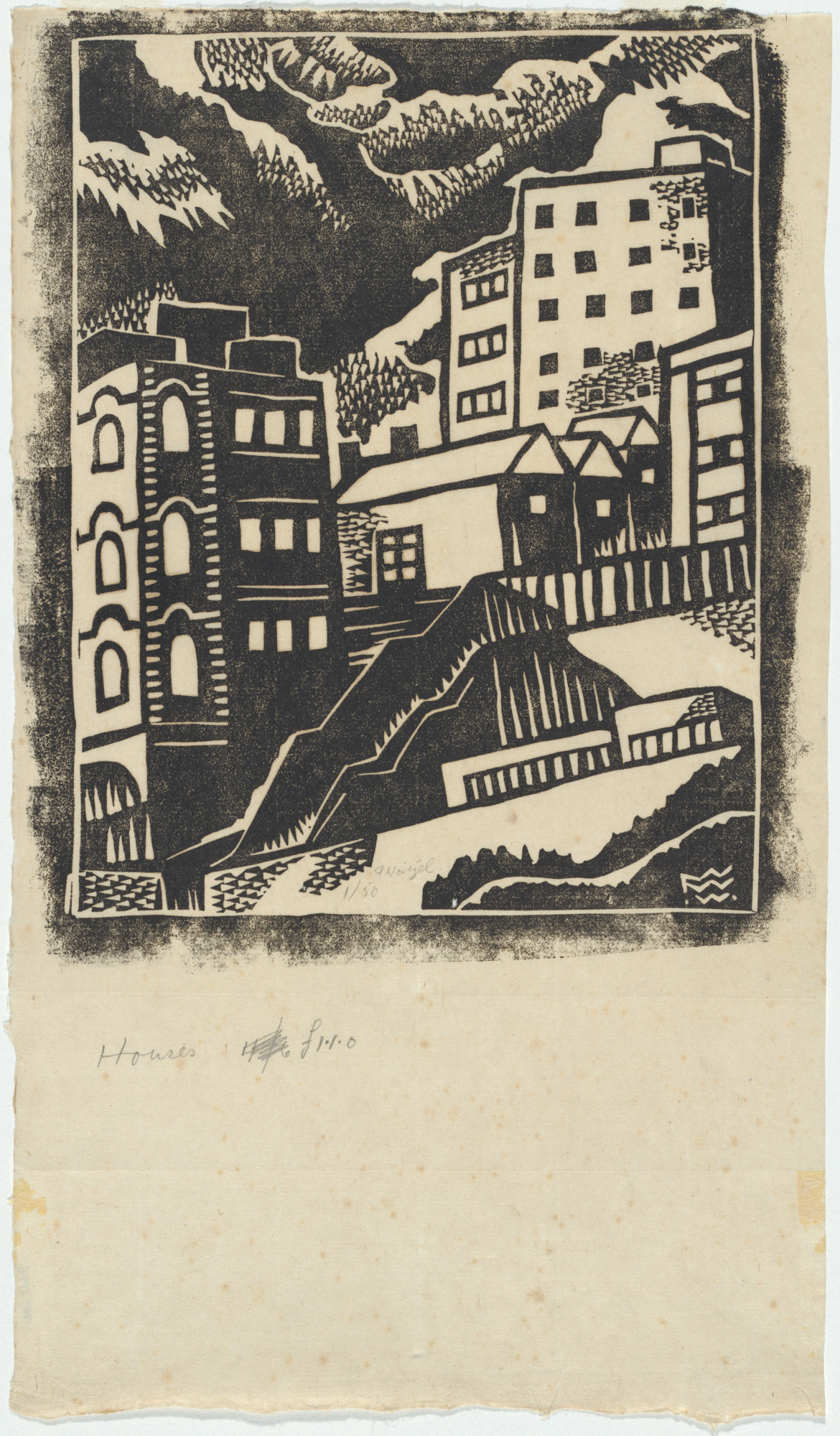
Houses (1928)

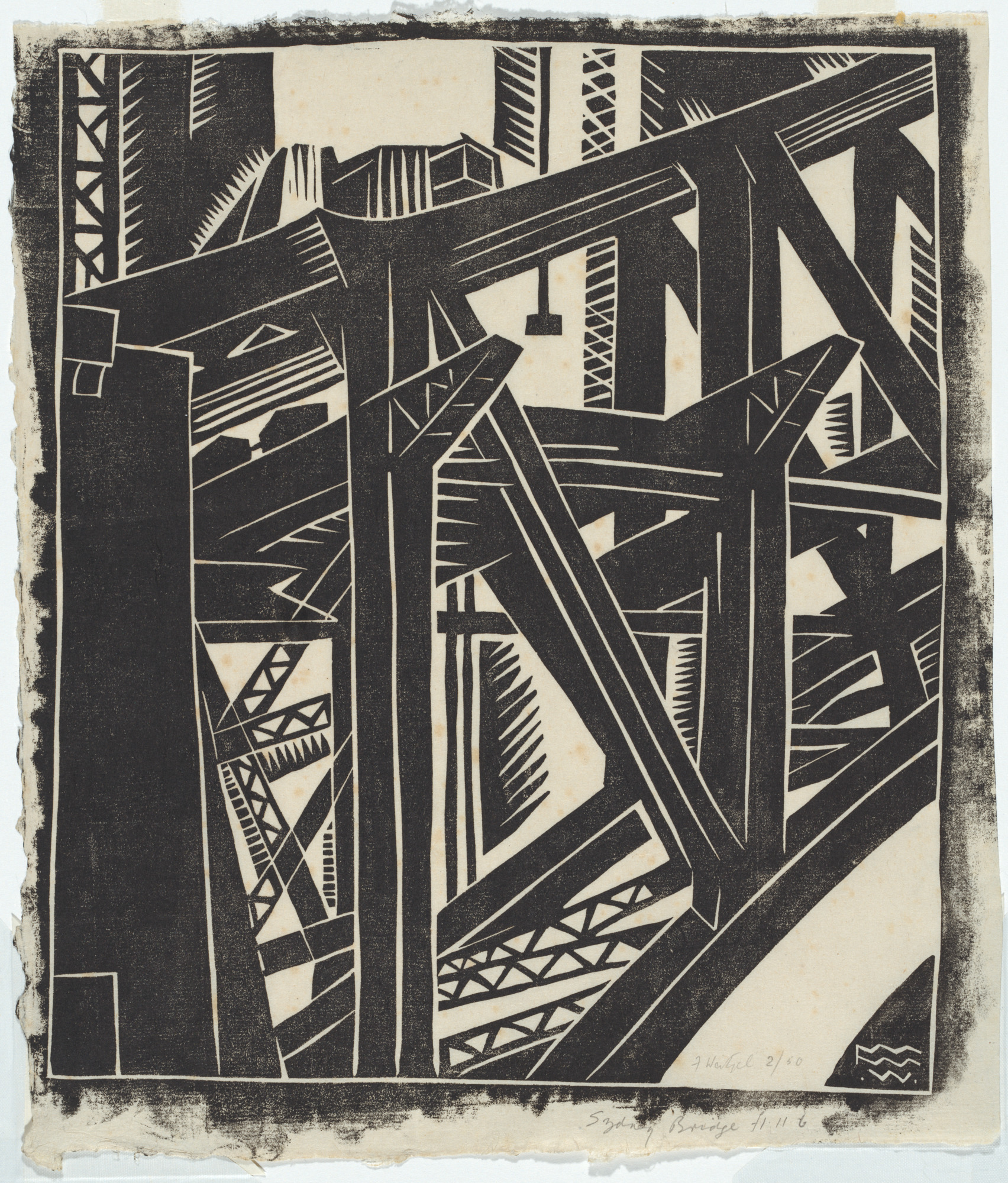
Sydney Bridge (c.1929)

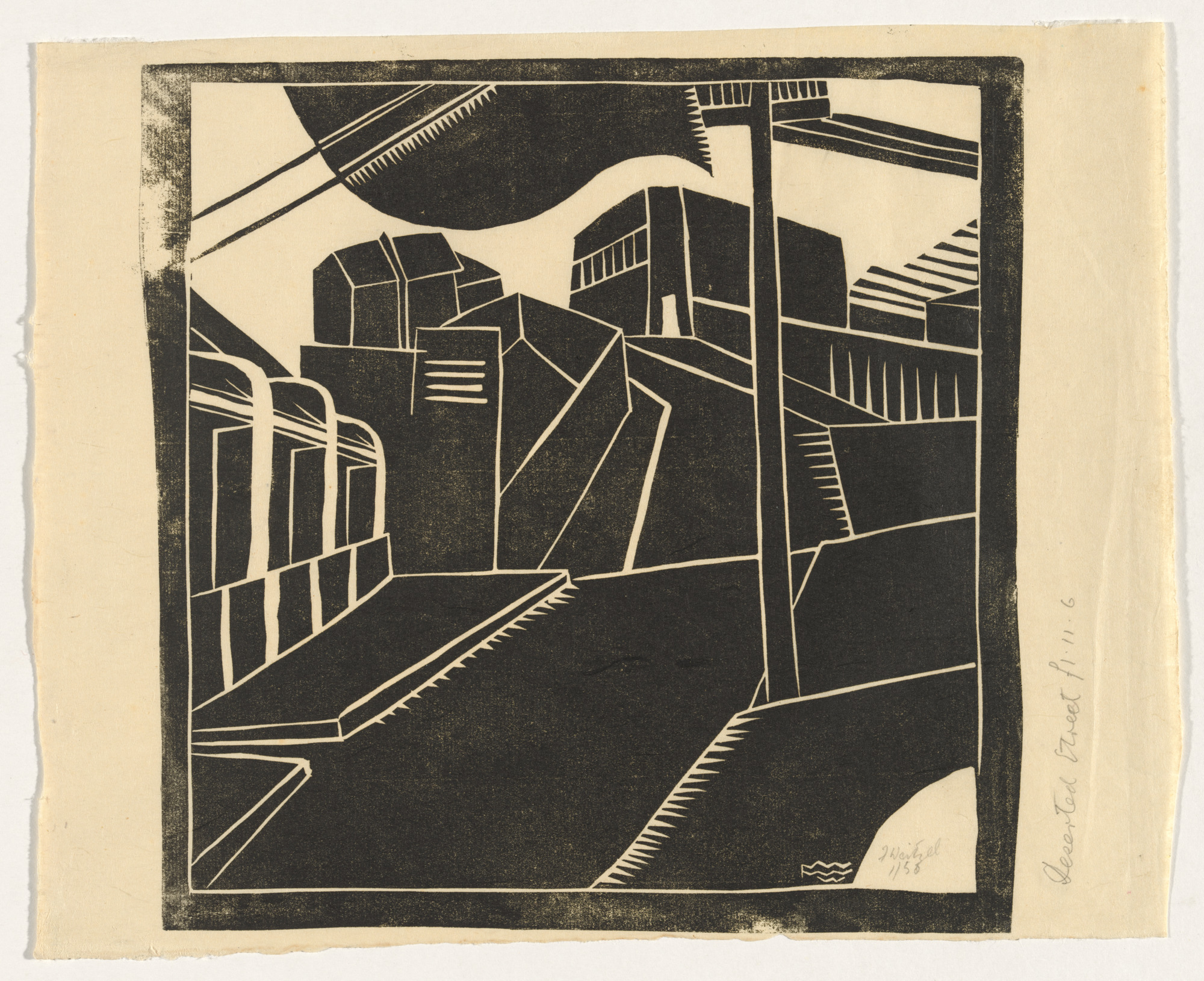
Deserted Street (c.1930)

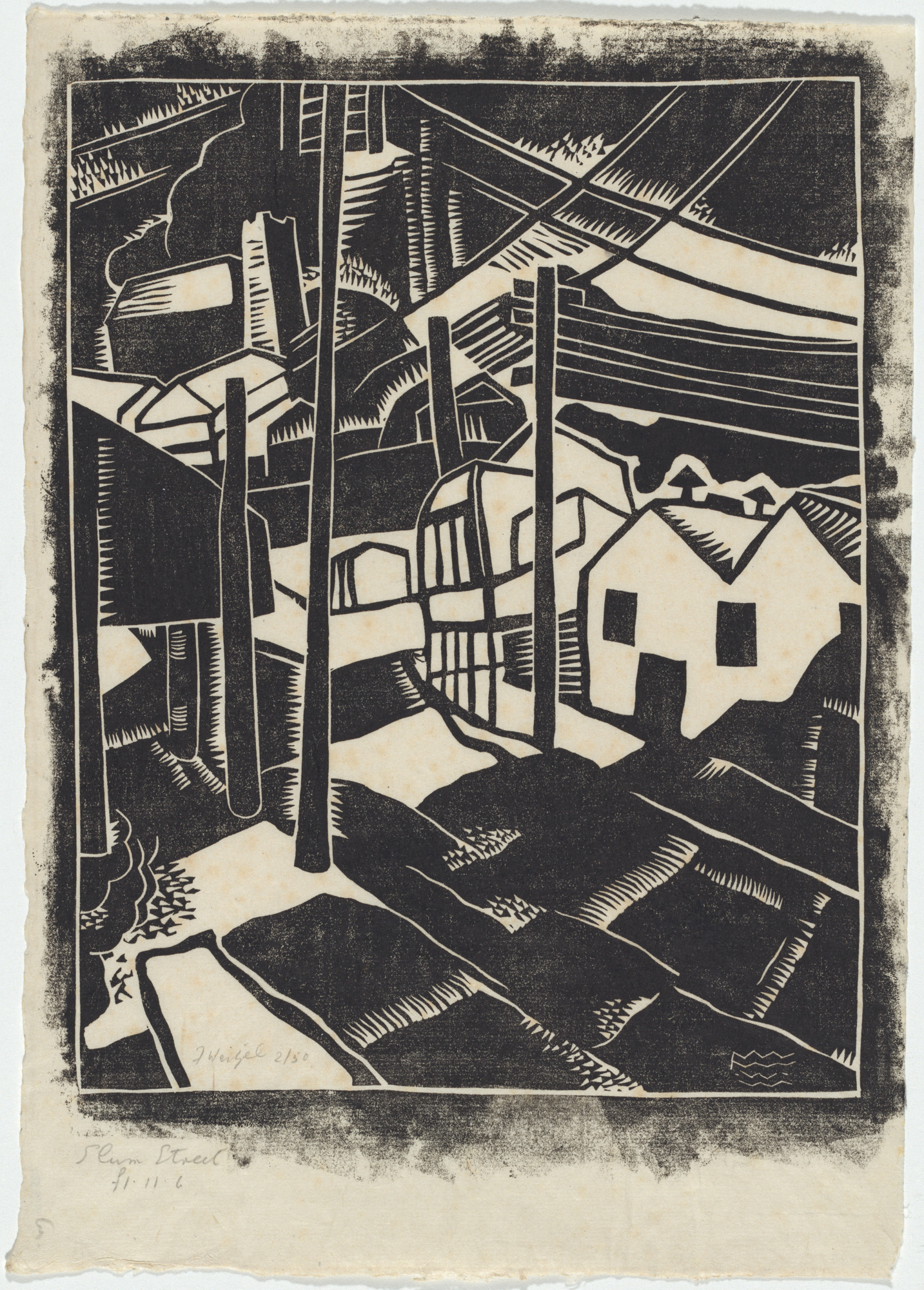
Slum Street (c.1930)

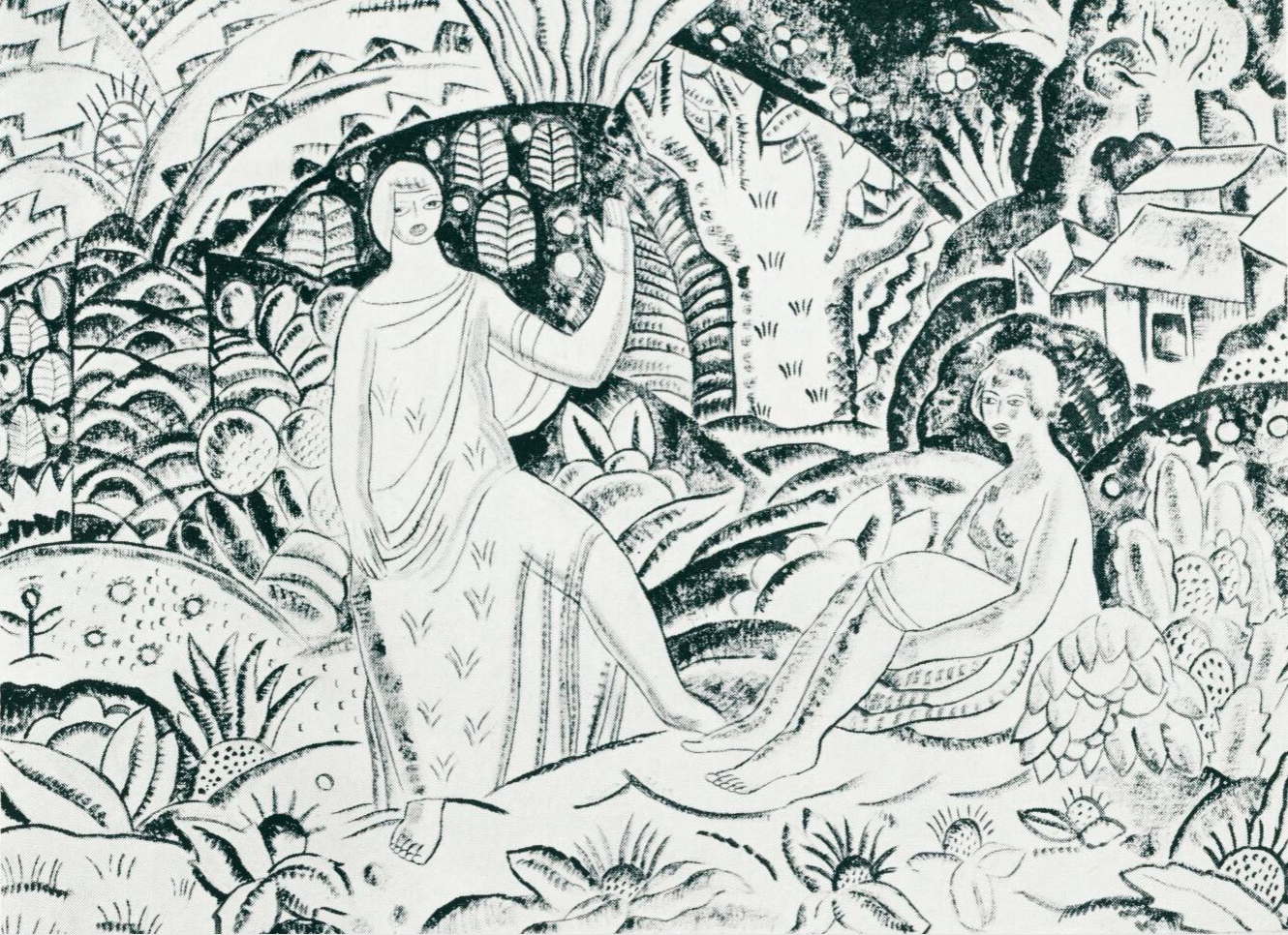
From September 1929 Art in Australia

Weitzel came to the attention of Dorrit Black who had recently returned from studying linocut with Claude Flight at the Grosvenor School of Modern Art. With Black's encouragement he joined a circle of Sydney artists known as the "Group of Seven" and in March 1930 had several sculptures in their first show at the Macquarie Galleries. Journalist Colin Simpson described him as "a sculptor accomplished and sincere". He worked from a studio over a butcher shop on Circular Quay, making prints and creating bookends, wall hangings, linocut batik shawls, and lampshades. He was also a violinist, playing in the Sydney Conservatorium Orchestra.

A lack of recognition from the Australian public, and the controversy from his sister Hettie's Communist politics, induced Weitzel to move to London. To raise funds he created bookplates and exhibited for sale sculptures, linocuts, and printed scarves and shawls at Macquarie Galleries and Dorrit Black's Modern Art Centre. He arrived in London in 1930 with an introduction to Claude Flight, who invited him to join the Grosvenor School circle on linocut artists, and create colourful multiple block prints, some in abstract designs. Weitzel exhibited his work at the Exhibitions of British Linocuts organised by Flight at London's Redfern Gallery in 1930 and 1931. Flight praised his work in a letter to Black: "It's original, strong, good of its kind & just the sort of work we want."

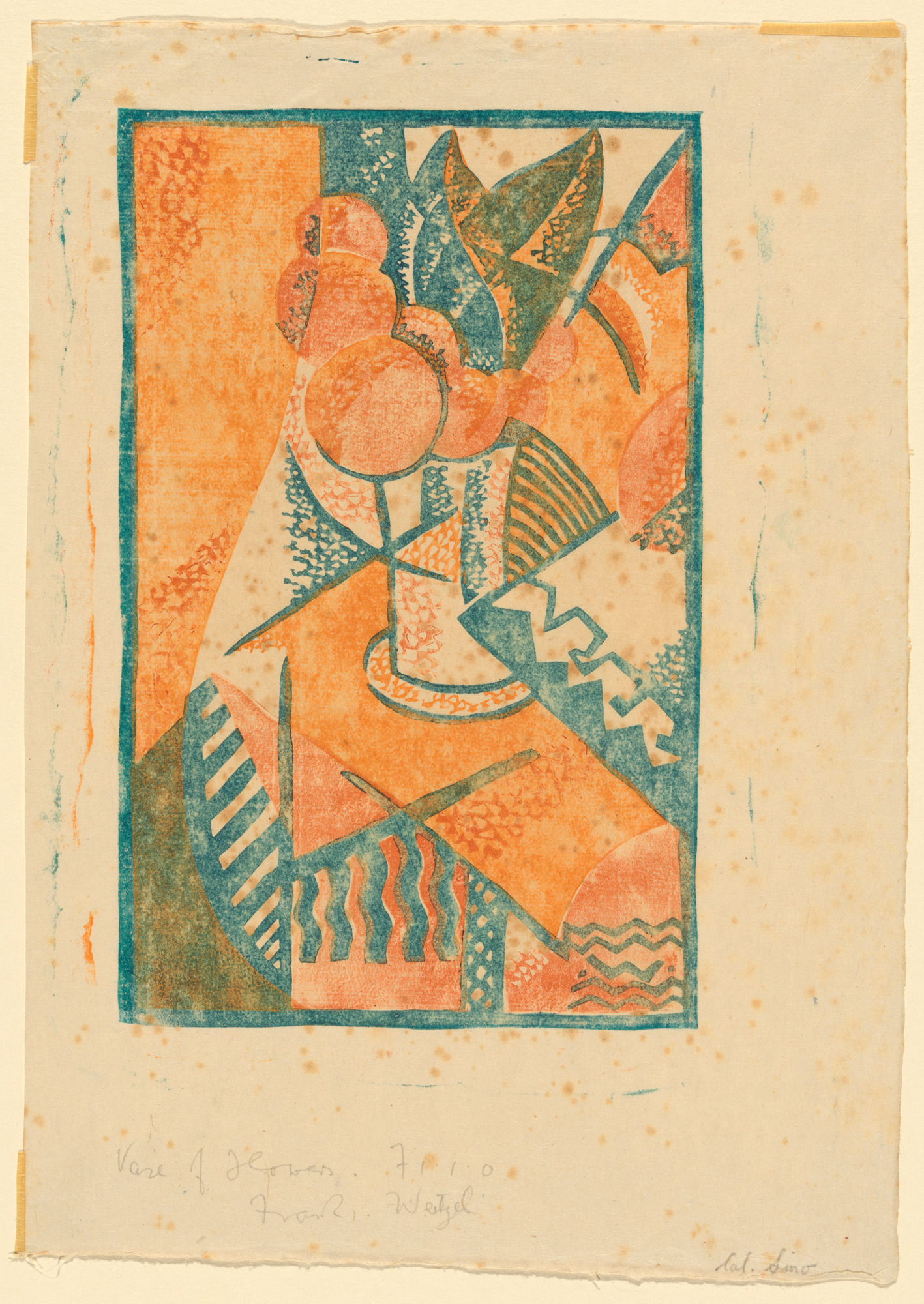
Vase of Flowers (1930)

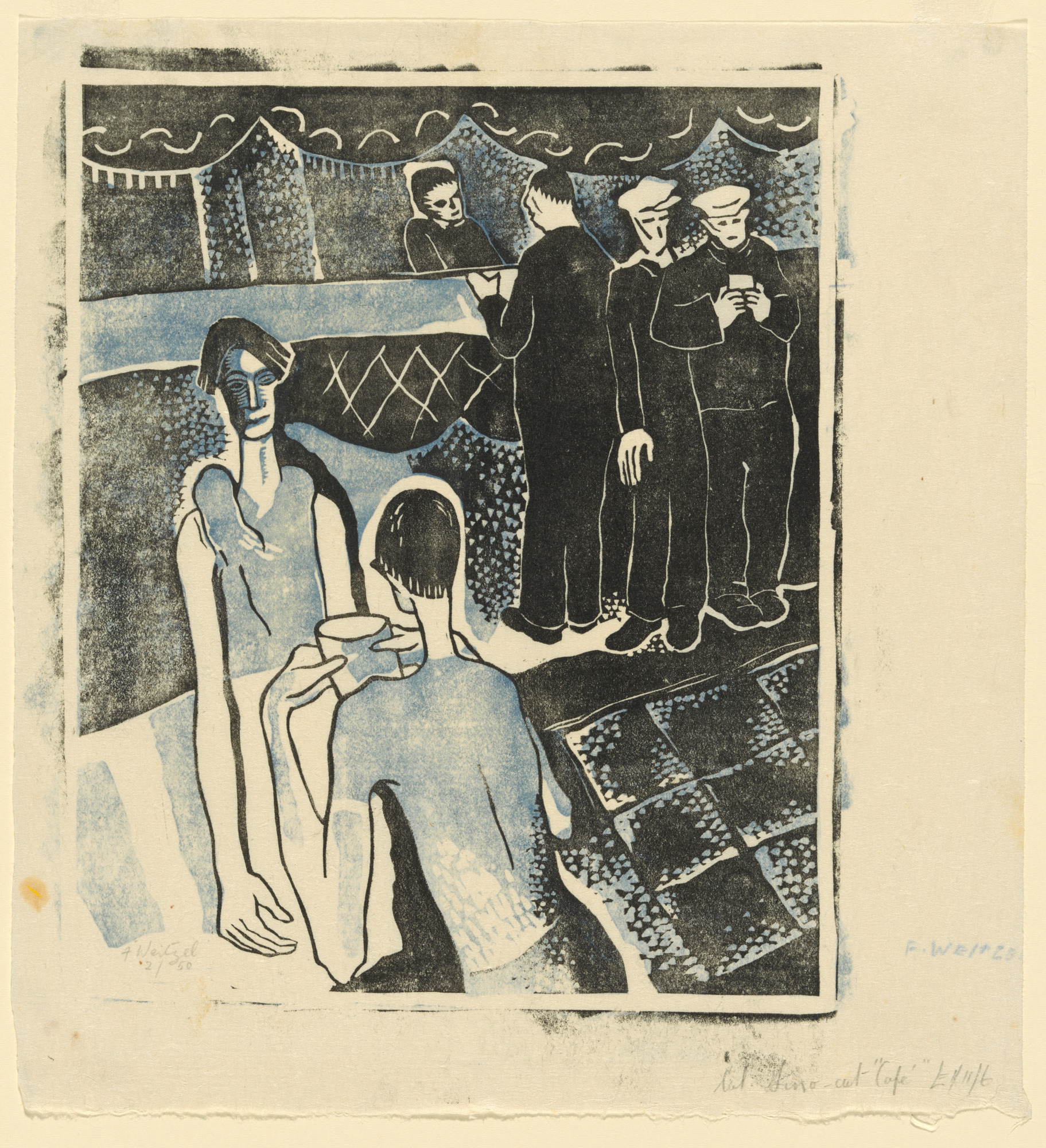
Cafe (c.1930)

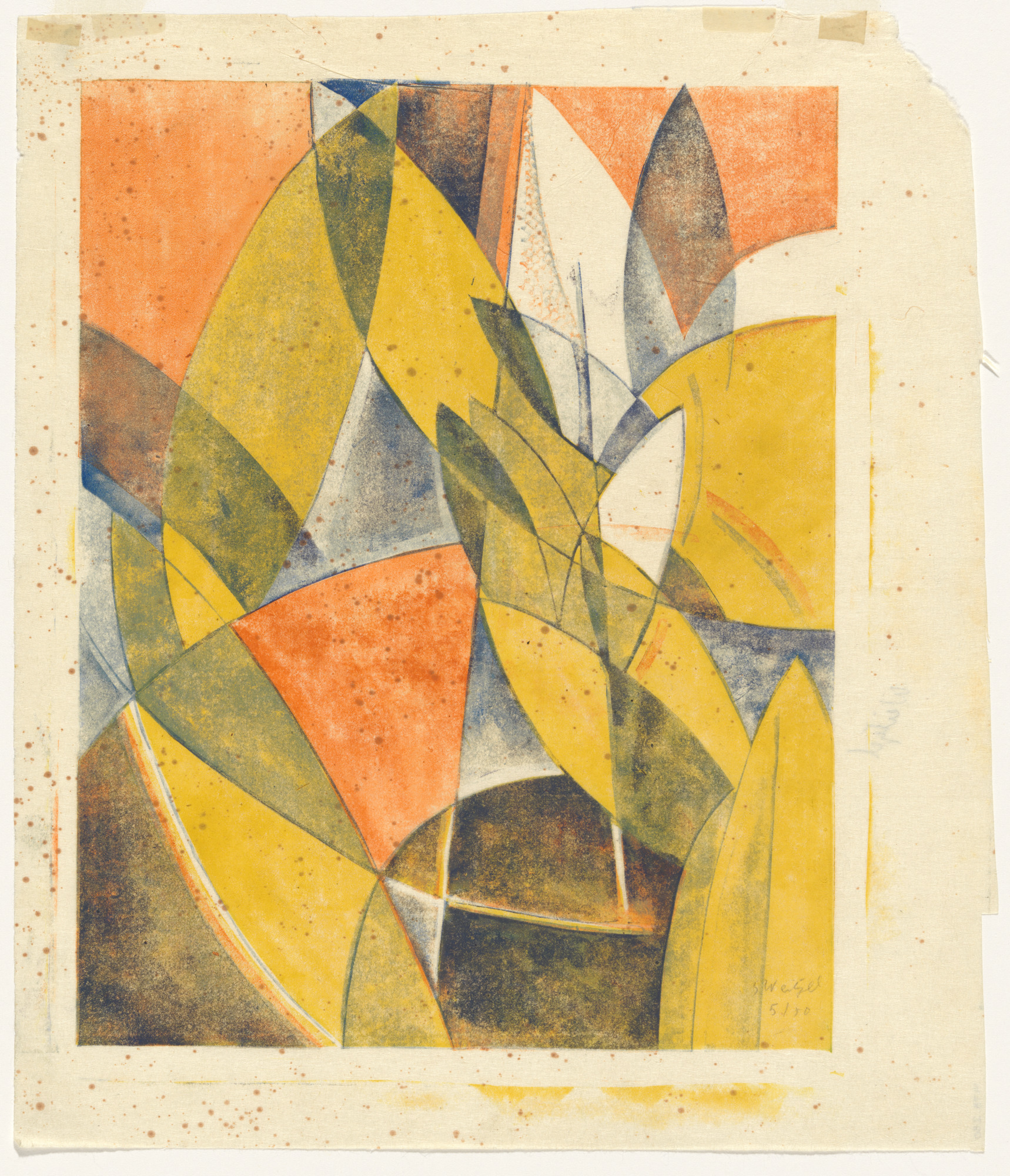
Abstract Design No. 1 (1931)

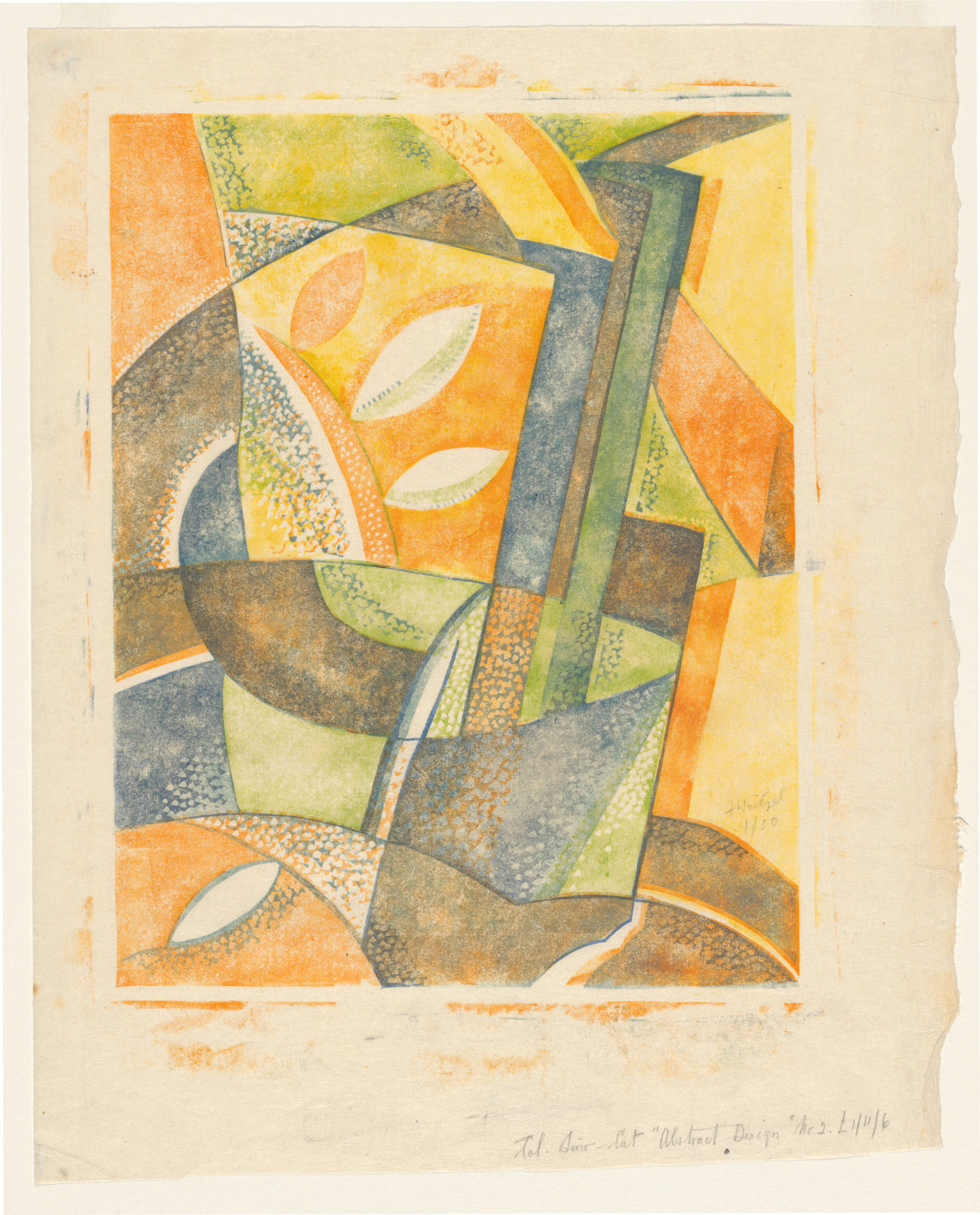
Abstract Design No. 2 (1931)

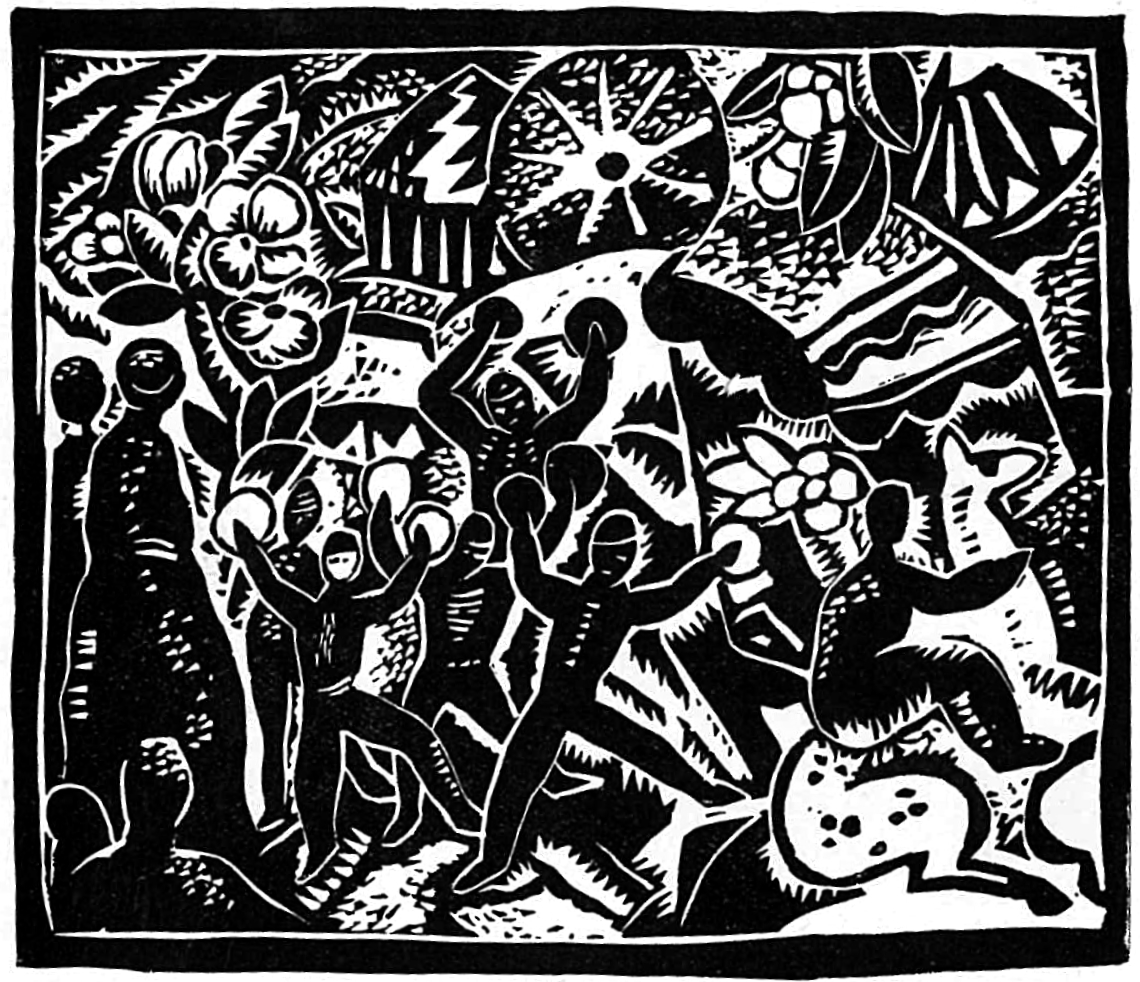
Carnival (1930)

The editor and Bloomsbury Group member David Garnett was unimpressed by Weitzel's illustration, but so taken with his sculpture he let him live rent-free as a caretaker in Hilton Hall, his country home in Cambridgeshire. Garnett also commissioned busts of his wife and son, and arranged for Weitzel to be exhibited alongside work by Duncan Grant, Paul Nash, John Nash, and Jacob Epstein. Garnett described him as "small, thin, with frizzy hair which stood piled up on his head, blue-eyed, with a beaky nose. I guessed he was not eating enough…He was proletarian, rather helpless, very eager about art and also about communism". Weitzel set up a sculpture studio in Hilton, and wrote to the journalist Colin Simpson in Australia: "Now I am working on a show of my own which is being arranged for me by some terrific money bags". While preparing for this, his first solo exhibition, he was digging clay for sculpture and contracted tetanus from minerals under his fingernails. He was found by Garnett taken to Huntingdon Hospital, where he died two days later, on 22 February 1932, at the age of 26. The Garnetts arranged for him to be buried in the Hilton village churchyard.

Although Weitzel was the subject of a moving tribute in the Sydney newspaper, his death went unnoticed by the New Zealand press. Weitzel was the subject of a retrospective exhibition organised by Dorrit Black at the Sydney Modern Art Centre, opened by John D. Moore on 7 June 1933. Weitzel's sister Mary had travelled to England to bring back 41 works for the show, which included linocuts and sculpture as well as poster designs for Underground Railways and Shell Motor Spirit. Flight reproduced Weitzel's linocut Carnival in his 1934 book The Art of Lino Cutting and Printing. There are now significant collections of Weitzel's linocuts and other works in the National Gallery of Australia and the Art Gallery of New South Wales, but in New Zealand collections he is mostly represented by works gifted to public galleries by Rex Nan Kivell, a New Zealander and director of the Redfern Gallery.
