= Gail Brodholt =

English artist

Gail Brodholt is an English artist known primarily for her oil paintings and linocut prints. She lives in Beckenham and works in Woolwich, both in South East London.

== Background ==
Brodholt studied at the School of Fine Art at Kensington University. She was elected an associate of the Royal Society of Painter Printmakers (RE) in 2006 and a Fellow in 2009 and was appointed Honorary Curator in 2013.

== Work ==
Brodholt's work is concerned with London and in particular its trains and Underground. Her work is titled after poetry and prose meaningful to her. She uses vivid colours and strong shapes which give a graphical quality to her work. She has exhibited widely in London and across the UK. Her technique has been described in detail in the book Printmakers' Secrets and the book Still Life.

Brodholt's work is also displayed at the London Transport Museum, and was part of an art installation at Blackfriars Station in 2009.

== Awards ==
Brodholt was awarded the 2018 Printfest Printmaker of the Year title.

== Exhibitions ==
- Gail Brodholt | A London Alphabet, 10 October - 3 November 2024, Eames Fine Art Gallery, London.
- Back to Black, 1 September - 17 October 2021, Eames Fine Art Gallery, London.
