= Carlos Cortez =

American artist & activist (1923–2005)

- Born: 1923; Milwaukee, Wisconsin
- Died: January 19, 2005 81 years old
- Other name: Koyokuikatl
- Citizenship: American
- Occupations: Poet, printmaker, graphic artist, photographer, songwriter, editor, muralist, political activist
- Known for: Poetry, songs and unique political artistry with linoleum
- Spouse: Marianna Cortez
- Parents: Alfredo Cortez (father); Augusta Ungerecht (mother)

Carlos Cortez (August 13, 1923 – January 19, 2005) was a postwar and contemporary artist who was also a poet, printmaker, graphic artist, photographer, songwriter, editor, muralist, and political activist. He was a member of the Industrial Workers of the World. Cortez had an extraordinary life with active political parents who taught him about pacifism and socialism. He followed his parents' path and became active in the IWW.

== Early years ==
Carlos Alfredo Cortez was born in Milwaukee, Wisconsin, on August 13, 1923. He is the son of socialist parents Alfredo Cortez and Augusta Ungerecht. Carlos was raised in a multicultural, highly talented, and supportive home. Carlo's father, Alfredo, was a Yaqui, Mexican, who spoke five languages but sang in seven. Alfredo worked as a construction worker, was a union organizer, and was a wobbly member of the Industrial Workers of the World. Carlos's mother, Augusta was a socialist pacifist of German descent, spoke German, and was born in Racine, Wisconsin. She worked as a domestic worker and also became a wobbly member of the IWW. Alfredo and Augusta married in 1923.

The Cortez family was not wealthy, and they were not religious; as most people were in their Milwaukee neighborhood, they were a part of the working class. From an early age, Cortez experienced racism and discrimination because of his parents' political beliefs and because his father was a dark-skinned Mexican. Although his father Alfredo did not finish elementary school, he was academically gifted. When Cortez was young, his mother spoke a children's version of German to him, referred to as Kinder-Deutsch. At the school he attended in Oak Creek, Wisconsin, the students were predominantly German and Mexican. Cortez was often teased by both groups of children because, due to his German, Native, and Mexican ancestry, he felt as if he did not belong.

Cortez's parents were supportive and helped him cope with the racism and discrimination he experienced growing up. His family lived in a predominantly immigrant community, and he learned to speak different languages from his neighbors and his mother. During this time, he chose to identify with his German and Mexican cultures and used the experiences he went through to inspire his artistic mind. He identified as Latino and Native American but focused a lot of his works on his Native and Mexican cultures and supported many events related to his self-identification. In the late 1970s, Cortez was at a ceremony at Casa Aztlan and met with a Spanish and Nahuatl-speaking Indian who had given him the spirit nickname of Koyokuikatl which meant "singing Coyote". Cortez enjoyed painting, sketching, and drawing. He chose not to attend a traditional college but instead took classes at the Layton Art Gallery. To support his artistic talent, he took on normal jobs working as a teacher, factory worker, salesman, writer, Illustrator editor, and construction. His father, Alfredo Cortez, used his influence to assist him in obtaining a job in construction. Another part of Cortez's life that made him happy was his wife, Mariana Drogitis, whom he met in 1957 when she visited Milwaukee. She was originally from Patras, Greece.

== Activism ==
Cortez's father encouraged Cortez to join his first political organization, and he joined the Young People's Socialist League (YPSL). As a child, his parents left a big impression on him. Cortez expressed his opposition to injustices, the government, and the world's ecological issues through artistic mediums. His choice of literary weapons were his prolific poetry, corridos, hymns, and haikus complimented by his notable wood arts, engravings, and political cartoons. Cortez specialized in story-telling poetry, describing tales of working people's daily realities. These stories eventually made it into his column for the Industrial Worker of the World called "The Left Side". He was a member of the IWW for almost 60 years. Cortez was also a labor organizer with the IWW and invested in working with fellow artisans. He was a pacifist like his mother, Augusta. During World War II Cortez was sent to prison at the Federal Correctional Institution, Sandstone, Minnesota for 2 years for refusing to be drafted because it went against his pacifist/socialist views. He believed that there was no nation worth fighting for; the struggle worth fighting for was the working class. While in prison, he took the time to do a lot of reading and speak with people of different ethnicities. He investigated the ways in which art may spur social change, highlight marginalized groups, honor indigenous cultures, and advance peace—all ideas that had influenced Mr. Cortez to produce art. By portraying images of labor disputes and protests and ignoring historical events and figures, Cortez's life's work elevated the working class, marginalized communities, and social battles.

== Artistic career ==
Cortez was in elementary school when he taught himself to turn his drawings into blocks of new medium wood and linoleum cut blocks to express labor-oriented art along with his writings. This allowed for easier printing of multiple copies of his work. In his artistic career, he used his printing press, Gato Negro, to spread themes of justice, activism, and solidarity. Cortez frequently used his poems to bring attention to, elicit discussion from, and motivate action on matters of oppression and inequality. Cortez believed that art should have a purpose, and that purpose almost always involved the emancipation of the working class. His art expressed his activism of labor and civil rights as well as the support of hard working men and women from miners to farm workers. Carlos's art helped to bring focus on the struggles of the Mexican and Native people and to fight tyranny. His printmaking inspiration came from Jose Guadalupe Posada and from German artist Kathe Kollwitz. His works as a poet, muralist, and graphic designer were depictions of issues facing the average person and are displayed in local galleries and the Smithsonian Institution.

=== Collections of art ===
At the National Museum of Mexican Art there are various collections on display of Cortez's work. Several political linocut designs as early as 1963 through early 2000's. Carlos Cortez's endowment to Chicago's Mexican Fine Arts Center Museum was to house more than 100 wood and linoleum printing blocks and if the value of his artwork were to increase, the blocks were to be utilized to manufacture more in order to bring the price down to make them available to art enthusiasts. Cortez has had his various artwork and writings displayed in Mexico and the United States in various museums, exhibitions, and events. The following are just a few of the places where his artistic work has been featured and honored:

- Museum of Modern Art in New York City.
- National Museum of American Art in Washington D.C.
- Elmhurst Art Museum in Illinois.
- National Museum of Mexican Art in Illinois.
- DePaul of Modern Art in New York City.

== Literary works ==
- Cortez, C. (1990) This book is dedicated to my parents, - libcom.org. (n.d.). https://files.libcom.org/files/Crystal-gazing%20the%20amber%20fluid%20and%20other%20Wobbly%20poems.pdf
- Cortez, C. (1992). De Kansas a Califas & Back to Chicago. March/Abrazo Press.
- Cortés, C. (1997). Where are the voices? & other Wobbly poems (First edition.). C.H. Kerr Pub. Co..
- Cortez, C. (1999). Carlos Cortez Exposición. Fundación de Estudios Libertarios Anselmo Lorenzo.
- Cortez, C. (2002). Carlos Cortéz Koyokuikatl: Soapbox artist & poet. Mexican Fine Arts Center Museum.
- Cortez, C. (2002b). Making Love with our eyes. Trafford.
- Cortez, C. (2002c). Viva Posada!: A salute to the great printmaker of the Mexican Revolution. Charles H. Kerr publ.
- Cortez, C., Cumpián, C., Ranney, D. C., Sasaki, F., & Arceo-Frutos, R. H. (2023). Coyote’s song: Collected Poetry and Selected Art. Charles H. Kerr Publishing Company.
