= Wetzell =

Wetzell is a surname. Notable people with the surname include:

- Georg Wetzell (1869–1947), German military officer
- Oskar Wetzell (1888–1928), Finnish Olympic diver
- Pippa Wetzell (born 1977), New Zealand television personality and journalist
- Richard Wetzell (born 1961), American historian
- Stig Wetzell (born 1945), Finnish ice hockey player
- Yanni Wetzell (born 1996), New Zealand basketball player

== See also ==
- Wetzell-Archbold Farmstead, historic farmhouse in Washington, D.C.
- Zebediah F. and Mary H. Wetzell House, historic residence in St. Louis, Missouri
- Wetzel (disambiguation)
