= Emma Bormann =

Austrian painter and graphic designer

- Born: 1887; Vienna, Austria
- Died: 1974 (aged 86–87); Riverside, California, US
- Known for: Printmaking
- Spouse: Eugen Milch

Emma Bormann (1887–1974) was an Austrian artist (primarily a printmaker) who lived in Vienna, Shanghai, Tokyo, and Riverside, California.

== Biography ==
Emma Bormann was born in 1887 in Vienna. Her father, Eugen Bormann (1842–1917), was an archaeologist and a professor of ancient Roman history and epigraphy at the University of Vienna. She received a doctorate in prehistory at the same university in 1917 (with a dissertation on the Neolithic period in Lower Austria). While a student at the university, she also took classes at the Institute for Teaching and Experimentation in Graphic Arts with Ludwig Michalek. Emma Bormann pursued interests in athletics and drama as well, but art was to be her true calling.

She went to Munich in 1917 and enrolled in art classes for one semester before becoming an art teacher herself. It was in Munich at this time that she began making woodcuts. She quickly mastered this medium and developed a unique style that blended expressionism and impressionism and combined respect for traditional woodcut craft with a more modern sensibility.

Emma Bormann traveled widely during her lifetime. Before her departure for China in 1939, she visited many cities in Europe and made her first visit to the United States in 1936. Cityscapes and crowded public squares, often viewed from above, were among her favorite subjects, as well as the interiors of theaters, concert halls, and opera houses. When she arrived in a new city, she looked for a tower, tall building, or hill that would provide this perspective. Her works from these years are a record of her travels, showing many cities in Germany, the Netherlands, Croatia, Italy, Sweden, London, Istanbul, Paris, Prague, and Budapest. Her 1936 visit to the United States resulted in memorable views of New York, Chicago, Philadelphia, Washington, D.C., and Niagara Falls. Her works include many images of her native country as well, views of Vienna and other places in Austria, such as Salzburg and the countryside of Salzburg province. In 1927, the centennial of the composer Beethoven's death, she completed and published an album of woodblock prints showing the houses where Beethoven had lived in Vienna and the surrounding towns.

In 1924, she married Eugen Milch (1889–1958), a physician and a talented painter and etcher in his own right. She taught courses in drawing, figure drawing, and linocut techniques as a lecturer at the University of Vienna from 1926 to 1939. Eugen Milch went to China in December 1937 with an Austrian medical mission by invitation of the Chinese government. When the Austrian physicians arrived, their contracts were not honored by the Chinese national health administration, but Dr. Milch remained in China. By March 1938 he managed to secure a position with the Church Missionary Society as superintendent of the Puren Hospital in Pakhoi (Beihai). Emma Bormann and their two daughters went to China and joined Dr. Milch in late 1939.

A Japanese military invasion of the South China coast in spring 1941 forced the Bormann-Milch family to leave Pakhoi and move to Shanghai, where Emma Bormann would remain until 1950. In spite of the hardships of this time and place, she was able to continue her artistic activity. Woodcuts and linocuts from this time show the Huangpu River and the busy streets of Shanghai, as well as her impressions of Hangzhou and Beijing, which she visited during the 1940s. In June–July 1947 a solo exhibition of her work was shown at the Smithsonian Institution in Washington, D.C. The Smithsonian's graphic arts curator, Jacob Kainen, wrote that "Dr. Bormann-Milch is unquestionably one of the outstanding woodcutters of our time. Aside from her phenomenal skill in suggesting tone and atmosphere in this intractable medium, the artist possesses a certain heroic and monumental quality of design."

In 1950 Emma Bormann left Shanghai, traveling across Japan, Hawaii, and the United States back to Europe. In April 1953 a solo exhibition of her work was held at the Austrian State Printing House in Vienna. She would make further visits to Europe, but did not live there again. Beginning in 1953, she resided in Tokyo with her daughter Uta. She made her last woodcuts some time in the late 1950s or 1960s; after this point she no longer had the strength in her arms for carving. She continued to sketch, paint, cut paper silhouettes and took up other media, such as stencil printing and mosaics. She studied and adapted a Japanese stencil printing technique. She made a series of stencil prints showing the dancers and musicians of the Japanese imperial court (performances of gagaku and bugaku). A significant exhibition of her work took place in January 1957 in Tokyo, organized by the Asahi Press Company. In fall 1957 she exhibited in Tokyo at the Japan Art Academy annual exhibition (Nitten) and received an award, significant recognition for a foreign artist living in Japan.

From 1958 until her death, Emma Bormann traveled back and forth regularly between Japan and Riverside, California, where her second daughter Jorun had settled. Her travels in the late 1950s and 1960s took her to Southeast Asia and Mexico. She died in Riverside in December 1974.

== Style and artistic subjects ==
Observers have often remarked on the dynamism and energy of her work.

Writing in 1922, the art historian and curator Arpad Weixlgärtner found that Emma Bormann's work reflected a characteristically Austrian response to modern art. The Austrian artist, he wrote "does not like to have an art fashion forced on him at once; first he tests it, selects what suits him, and alters what has been adopted according to his own judgment. So too Dr. Bormann is by no means to be found in the advance guard of modern art, but her works, rightly considered, could belong to no other period than the present. Even the choice of many of her subjects is characteristic of our time: a teeming square or hall in a terrifying contemporary metropolis."

Bormann's frequent subjects included panoramic city views, scenes of city streets and squares, and other public spaces like performance venues (e.g., theaters, opera houses, concert halls, and circuses). Her 1931 linocut "Dolma Bagtsché, Constantinople" (using what was then a new medium, linoleum) features the great Dolmabahçe Mosque silhouetted against a deep blue sea. This work won an Honorable Mention by the Art Institute of Chicago.

== Exhibits ==
Bormann's work was exhibited frequently during her lifetime. Museum collections currently holding her work include the Albertina in Vienna, the British Museum and the Victoria and Albert Museum in London, the Museum of Fine Arts in Boston, and the Metropolitan Museum of Art in New York, as well as the following:

- Museum für angewandte Kunst (MAK), Vienna
- Wien Museum (formerly Historisches Museum der Stadt Wien), Vienna
- Wienbibliothek im Rathaus, Vienna
- MUSA Museum auf Abruf, Kulturabteilung der Stadt Wien, Vienna
- Landesmuseum Burgenland, Eisenstadt
- Museum Ludwig, Cologne
- Rijksmuseum, Amsterdam
- Kröller-Müller Museum, Otterlo
- Teylers Museum, Haarlem
- Groninger Archieven, Groningen
- Moravská Galerie (Moravian Gallery), Brno
- Muzej Moderne i Suvremene Umjetnosti, Rijeka
- Muzej Grada Splita (Split City Museum), Split
- Galerija Umjetnina Split (Split Art Gallery), Split
- Muzeum Sztuki, Łódź
- Yokohama Museum of Art
- Riccar Art Museum, Tokyo
- Queensland Art Gallery, Gallery of Modern Art, Brisbane
- National Gallery of Victoria, Melbourne
- Fogg Art Museum and Busch-Reisinger Museum, Harvard University
- Clark Art Institute, Williamstown, Massachusetts
- William Benton Museum of Art, University of Connecticut, Storrs, Connecticut
- Syracuse University Art Museum, Syracuse, New York
- Museum of the City of New York
- Newark Public Library, Special Collections Division
- Baltimore Museum of Art
- Lauinger Library, Georgetown University
- National Gallery of Art, Washington, D.C.
- Library of Congress, Prints and Photographs Division, Washington, D.C.
- Corcoran Gallery of Art, Washington, D.C.
- Chicago Art Institute
- Cleveland Museum of Art
- Allen Memorial Art Museum, Oberlin College
- Minneapolis Institute of Arts
- University of Michigan Museum of Art, Ann Arbor
- Stanley Museum of Art, University of Iowa
- Pomona College Museum of Art, Claremont, California
- Fine Arts Museums of San Francisco, Achenbach Foundation for Graphic Arts
