= Witzel =

Witzel may refer to:

== People with the surname ==
- Vicelinus (c. 1090–1154), theologian and bishop of Oldenburg
- Adolph Witzel (1847–1906), German dentist
- Albert Witzel (1879–1929), American photographer
- Frank Witzel (born 1955), German writer, musician
- Fritz Witzel (born 1932), German motorcycle racer
- Georg Witzel (1501–1573), German theologian
- Michael Witzel (born 1943), German-American philologist
- Morgen Witzel (born 1960), Canadian historian and business theorist
- Oskar Witzel (1856–1925), German physician
- Ralf Witzel (born 1972), German politician
- Walter Witzel (born 1949), German politician
- Wilson Witzel (born 1968), governor of the Rio de Janeiro, Brazil

== Other uses ==
- German name of Vețel, Romania
