= Peeter Allik =

Estonian artist (1966–2019)

- Born: June 28, 1966; Põltsamaa, then part of Estonian SSR, Soviet Union
- Died: December 31, 2019 (aged 53); Tartu, Estonia
- Occupation: Artist
- Style: Surrealism, black and white dactyloscopic tendency

Peeter Allik (June 28, 1966 in Põltsamaa – December 31, 2019 in Tartu) was an Estonian artist and Surrealist (black and white dactyloscopic tendency).

== Biography ==
He graduated from University of Tartu.

In 1997, he became the first laureate of Ado Vabbe Prize.

In 2002, he also won the Grand Prix on VIII International Biennale of the Baltic states in Kaliningrad.

== Works ==
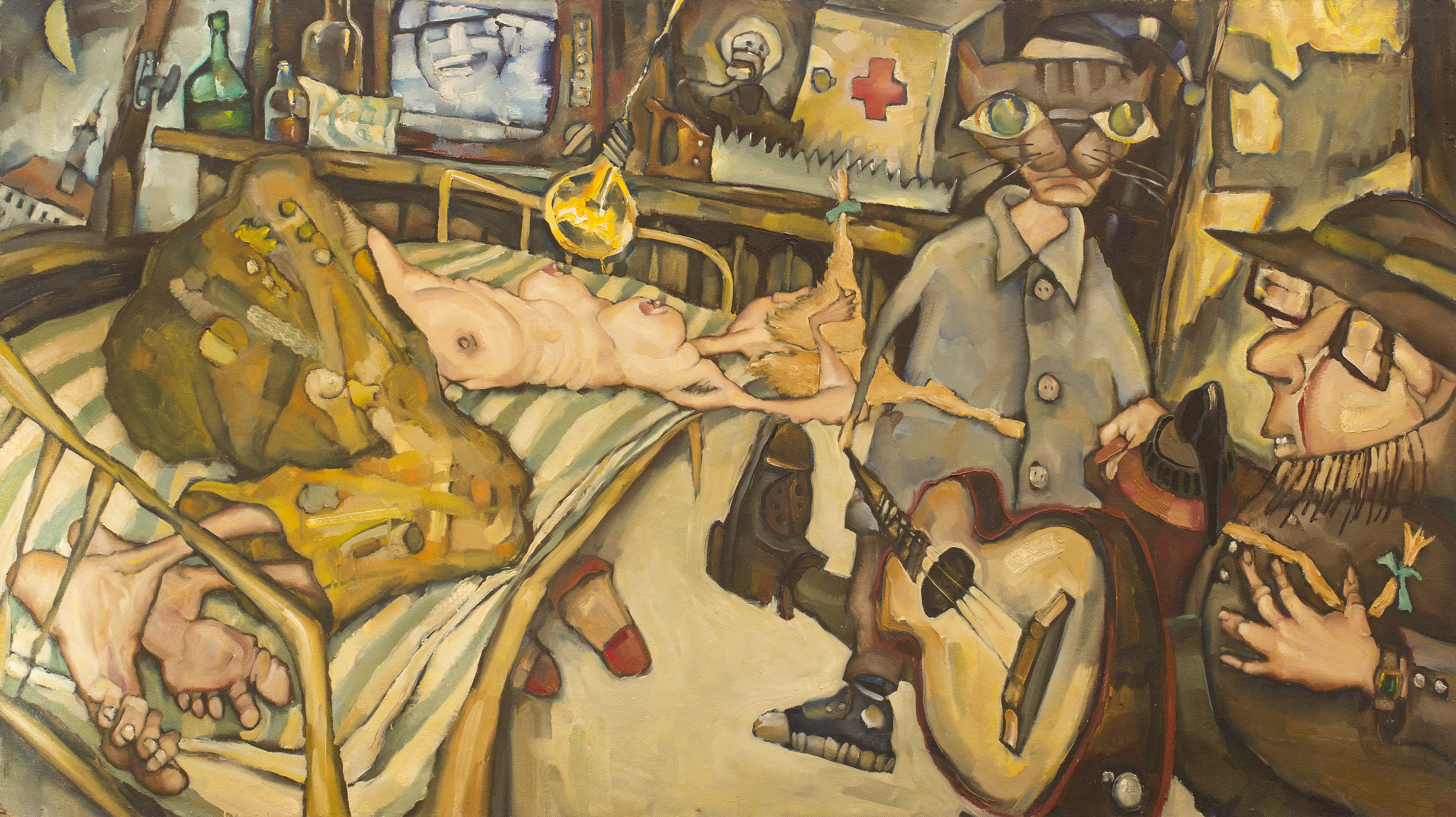
"Mardipäev", 1989

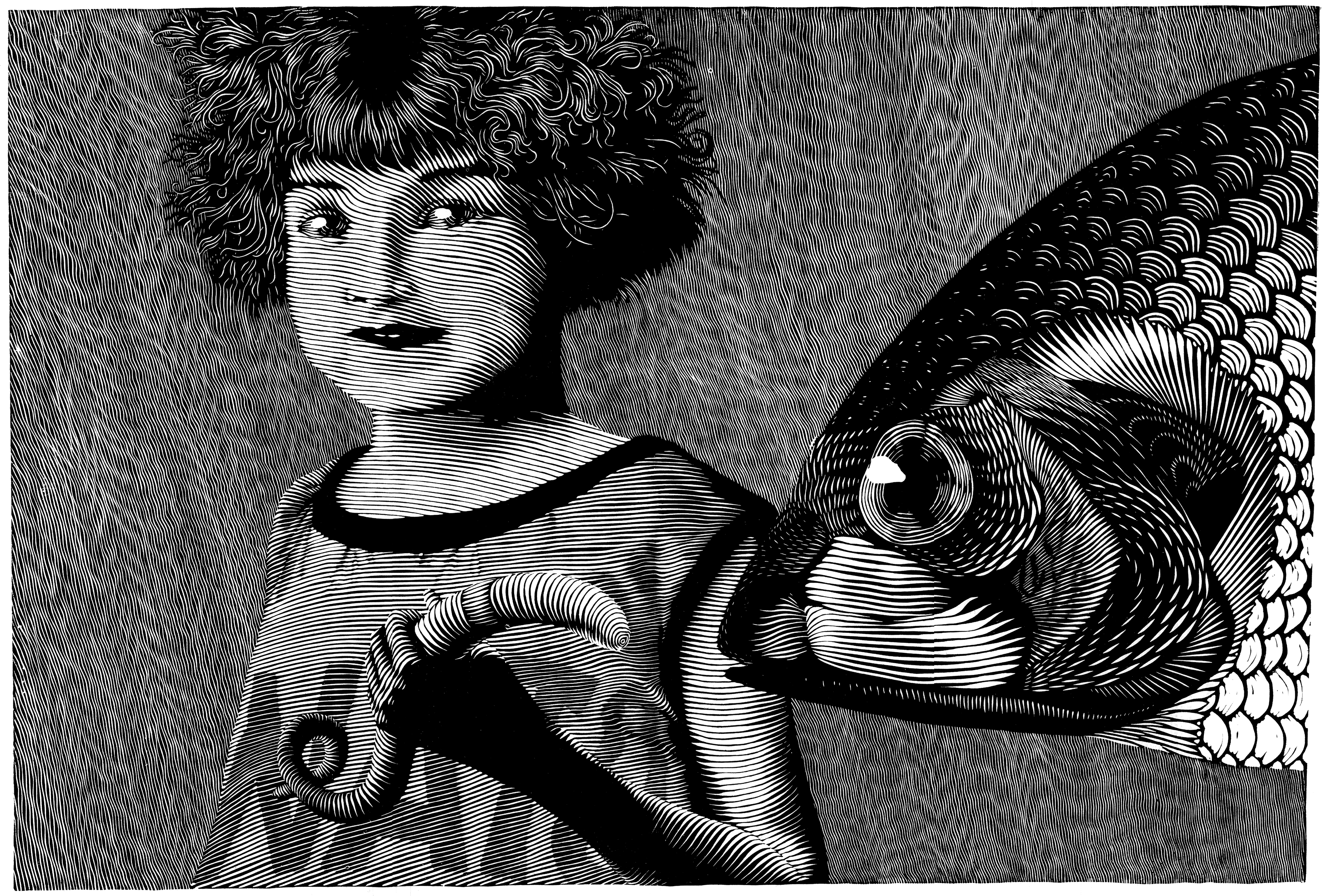
"Nato", 1996

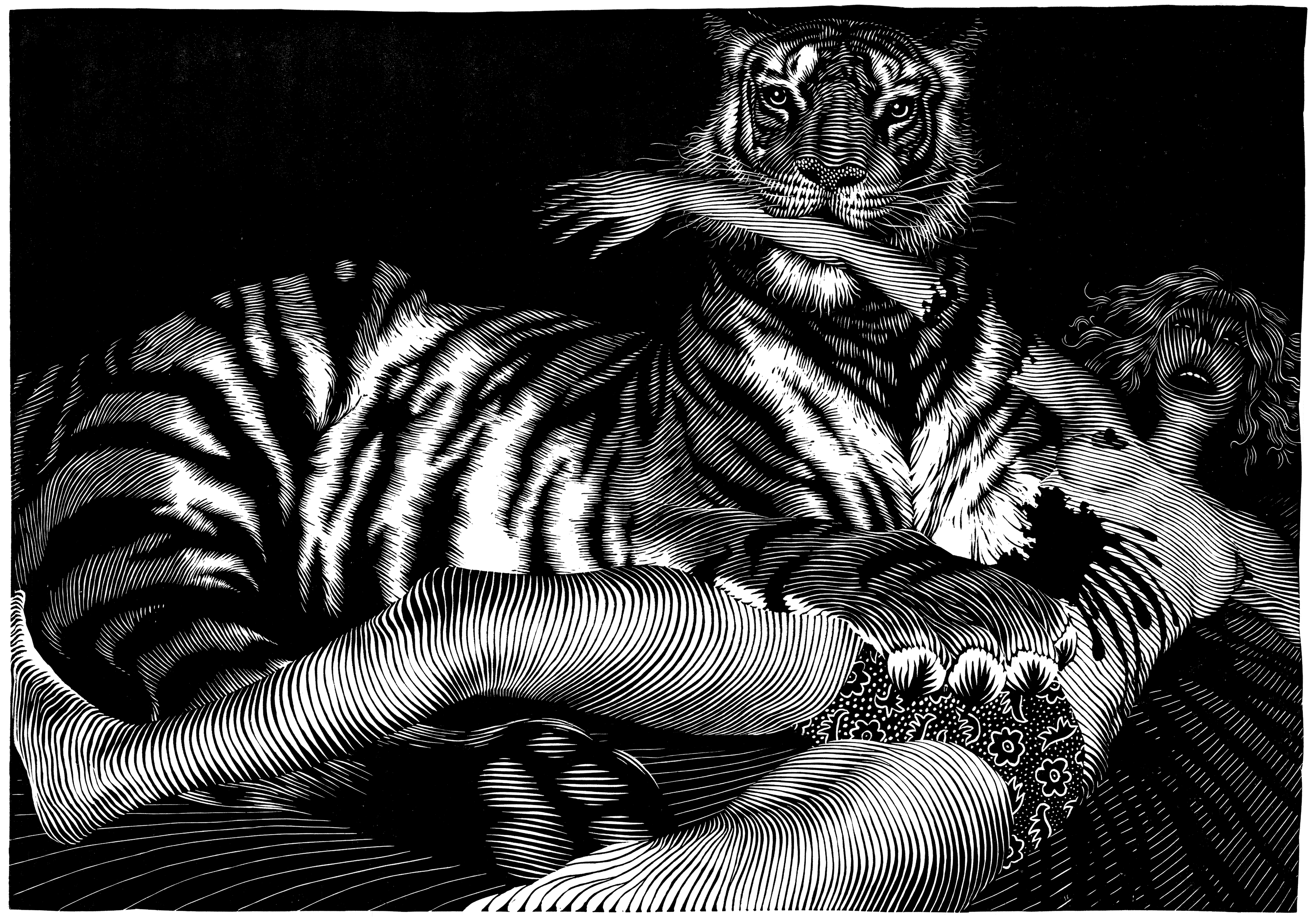
"Melanhoolia", 1999

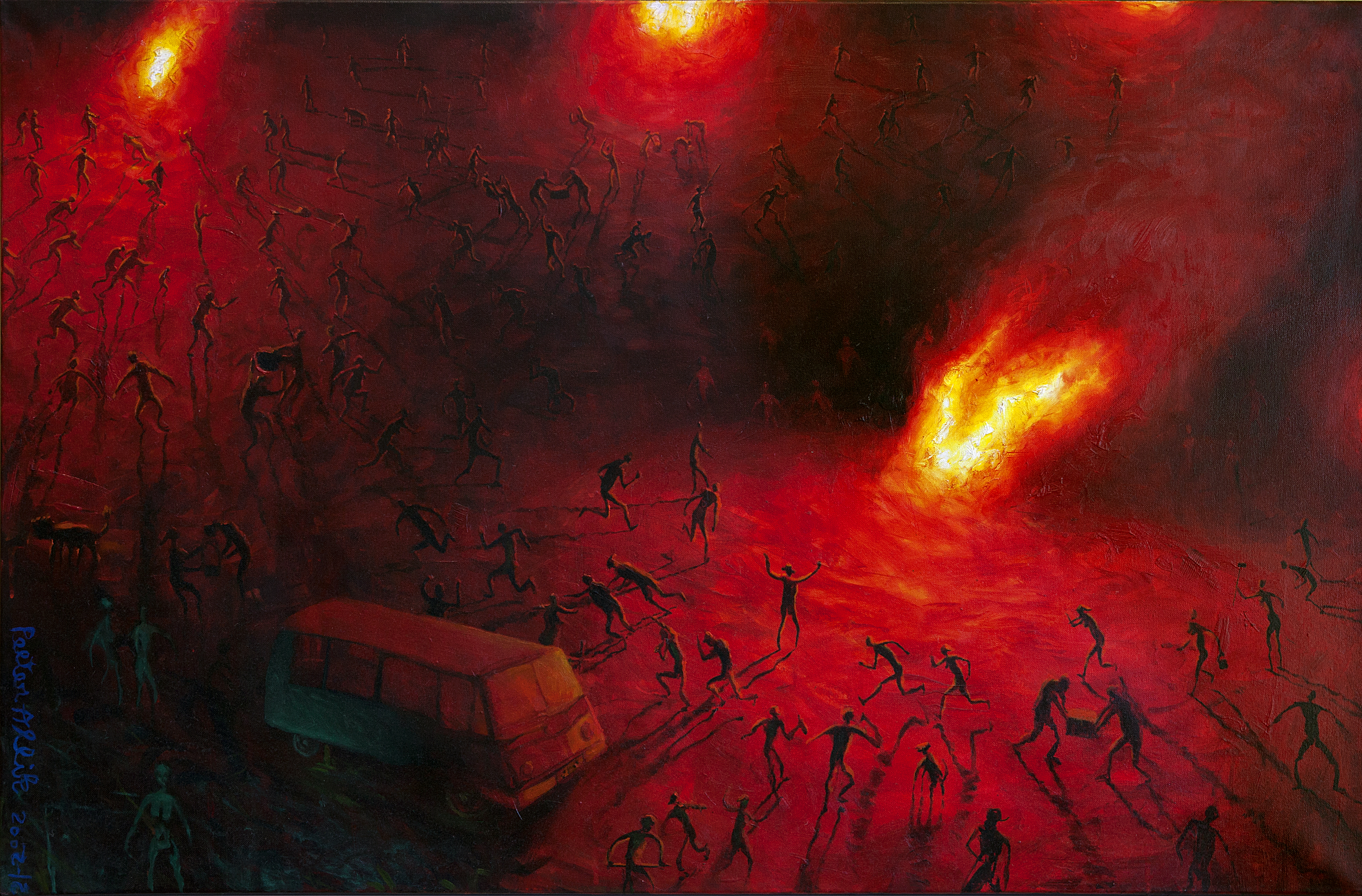
"Erastamisdokumentide põletamine", 2002

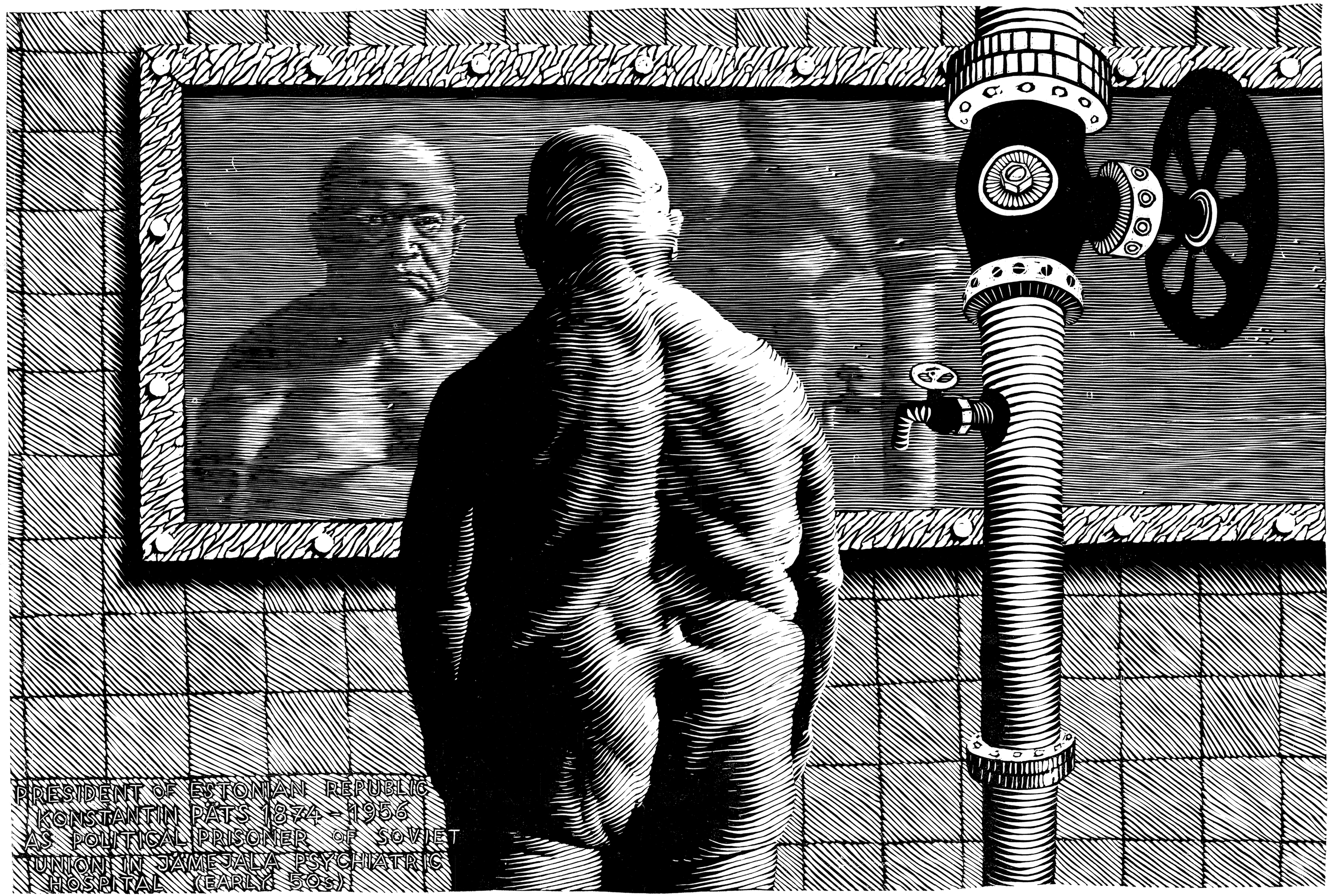
"Sündinud Nõukogude Liidus", 2002

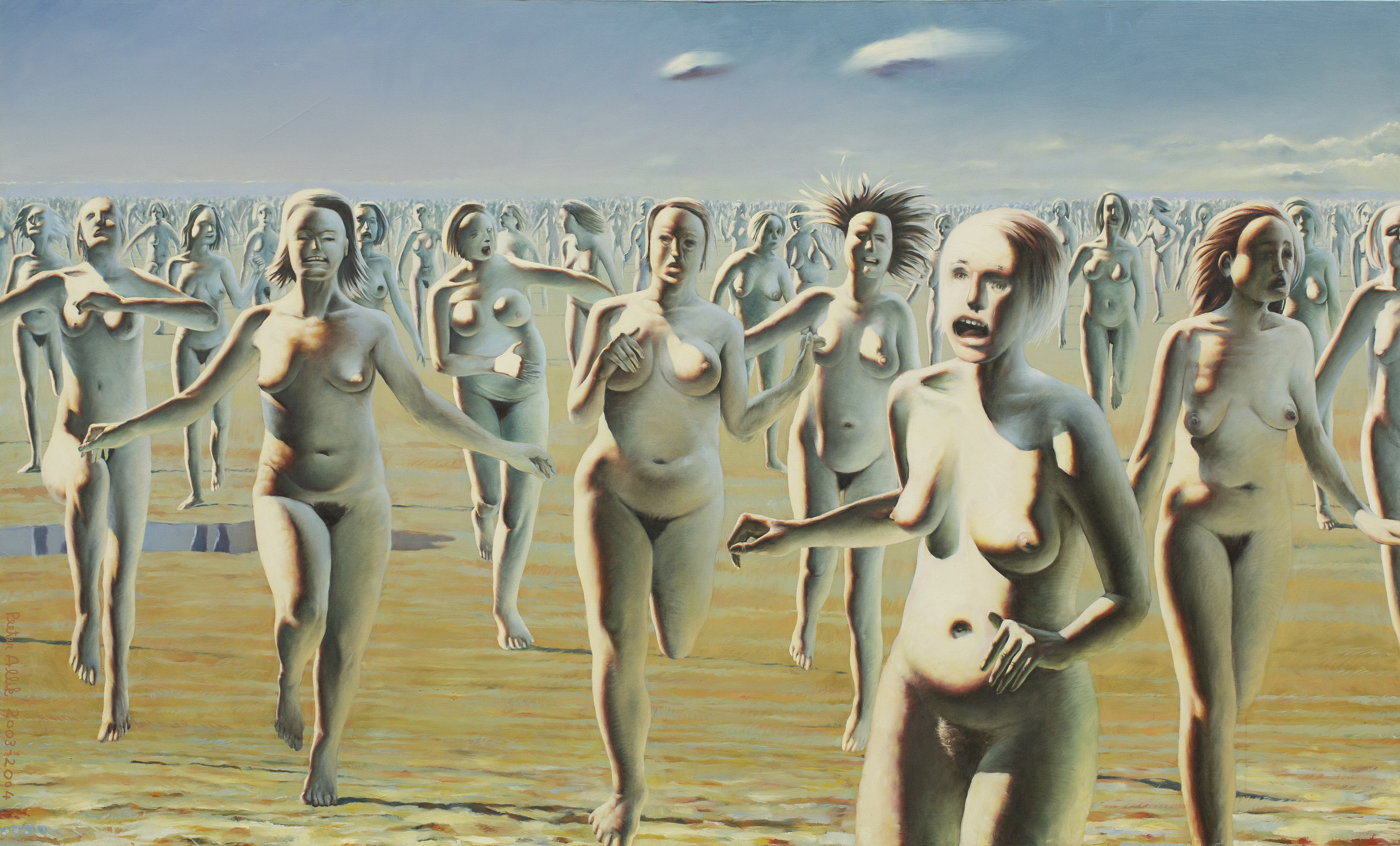
"Naised jooksevad", 2003-2004
