= Brad Weitzel =

Baseball coach and scout

Brad Weitzel is an American baseball player, scout, coach, and author. Across his coaching and scouting career, he has amassed 77 big leaguers, including Harrison Bader (2021 Gold Glove), Pete Alonso (2019 NL ROY), Jonathan India (2021 NL ROY), J.D. Martinez (6 time All-Star), A.J. Pierzynski (19 year MLB catcher), Doug Mientkiewicz (2001 Gold Glove, 2004 WS champion, and 2000 Olympic gold medalist), Denard Span (11 year MLB outfielder and 2014 NL hits leader), Steve Pearce (2018 WS MVP), Lance Carter (2003 All-Star), Chris Heston (2015 no-hitter as MLB rookie), and Anthony Swarzak (11 year MLB pitcher), among others.

Weitzel has coached at Palm Beach Community (now State) College (1984–1987), the University of North Florida (1987–1991), and the University of Florida (2007–2019). He also was the Florida area scout for the Minnesota Twins from 1991 until 2007. He has coached for the Twins' minor league affiliate Erie Sailors (1990), the Gulf Coast League Twins (1996 & 2000), and within the Minnesota Twins’ Instructional League program (1996–2001).

While at Florida, Weitzel was the key coaching piece to SEC regular season titles in 2010, 2011, 2014, 2017, and 2018, with 2017 also being the program's first national title campaign in school history. Weitzel coached several national and conference award winners while at UF, including Mike Zunino (Dick Howser Trophy), Brandon McArthur (Senior CLASS Award), and Jonathan India (SEC POY).

== Early life and athletics ==
Weitzel was born in 1957 to Judy and Bill Weitzel in upstate New York. He was joined by sister Kym in 1959 and brother Jay in 1960. Weitzel grew up playing football, basketball, and baseball across southwestern New York. and western Pennsylvania. Weitzel attended Salamanca High School, playing running back/safety in football, guard in basketball, and shortstop in baseball. Weitzel played for the storied Salamanca Warriors football program under Joe Sanfilippo and George Whitcher. Weitzel led the team in rushing twice and interceptions once. As a junior, Weitzel had a 3 interception game against rival Olean High School at historic Bradner Stadium, including a 104-yard return down the sideline containing Olean's bench. Weitzel was a Big 30 selection at defensive back.

On the hardwood, Weitzel put down 39 points against Hornell (NY), 31 points against Dunkirk (NY) on 15 of 20 field goals, and 26 points against Falconer (NY) (with 14 points in OT) in an era prior to the introduction of the shot clock and three point line. In a game against Olean (NY), Weitzel made 23 out of 27 free throws. In a holiday tournament at Hornell, he was named tournament MVP. He was considered a sharp shooter and slick ballhandler by opposing coaches and newspapers in the area.

Weitzel played in the World Fastpitch Softball Tournament two times as Team Florida's shortstop.

== Playing career (baseball) ==
Weitzel initially attended Palm Beach Community College in Lake Worth, FL. After playing at PBCC for two years, Weitzel earned a scholarship to the University of Georgia, playing two seasons there.

== Coaching (football and baseball) ==
Weitzel began his coaching career at Little Valley (NY) in 1982. He was an assistant on a varsity football team that won Division X and a sectional title at Rich Stadium (now Highmark Stadium), going 7–2. This is the solitary title the Little Valley football program has won in its history.

Weitzel began his baseball coaching career at Palm Beach Community College in 1984. He then made his way to UNF to assist in beginning the baseball program at the school in 1987. Initial recruiting efforts amounted to showing potential Ospreys where the future field and clubhouse would be. In spite of this, the overall four-year record during Weitzel's time at UNF amounted to 200–68, a nearly 75% win-loss ratio. The program made NAIA World Series appearances in 1989 and 1991 and generated five MLB players (Sid Roberson, Kevin Ohme, Todd Dunn, Brian Tollberg, and Boo Mullins) under Weitzel and Rhodes.

In the fall of 2007, Weitzel headed to the University of Florida in a return to college baseball. Weitzel immediately made his mark with the program, instilling toughness, resilience, and a commitment to fundamentals which had not been seen in recent years. With his past experience working with both pitchers and position players, Weitzel served as the de facto player development coordinator in all aspects of the Florida program. Practices were not short, with a far greater emphasis on defensive drilling than other teams within the SEC. Florida led the conference in fielding four separate years – 2010 and 2015–17, with an average fielding percentage of .976 from 2008 through 2019. Further, in conference play during his tenure, Florida averaged a .282 batting clip, good for third in the league. Florida advanced to the College World Series seven out of the twelve years Weitzel was on staff (2010–12, 2015–18).

Record-wise, Florida was 531–255 overall, good for a .675 winning percentage. Within the SEC, Florida garnered a record of 225–134, a .626 winning percentage – the best in the SEC during this time.

In total, in sixteen years of coaching college baseball, Weitzel led teams to the College World Series nine times (1989 and 1991 NAIA with UNF, and 2010–2012, 2015-18 Division I with UF).

== Scouting ==
Weitzel was the state of Florida area scout for the Twins from 1991 to 2007. During this time, he either signed or had drafted 19 future MLB players. The Florida Diamond Club bestowed their yearly MLB scout of the year award on Weitzel in 1998, 1999, and 2004.

== Education ==
BS in Health and Physical Education, University of Georgia.

MS in Health Education, Nova Southeastern.

== Works ==
42 Years of Dominance, an unpublished text on the history of the Salamanca Warriors football program.

== Other media ==
https://www.oleantimesherald.com/sports/salamanca-native-weitzel-an-ncaa-champion/article_58a75ce6-6208-11e7-8373-876543b024e8.html

https://www.baseballamerica.com/stories/gators-weitzel-helped-start-trend-of-scouts-turned-college-coaches/

https://www.bostonglobe.com/sports/redsox/2019/06/19/twins-discovered-martinez-but-didn-sign-him/CAKvpZhAaJjiaLLQXCqFaP/story.html

https://nypost.com/2022/10/08/mlb-playoffs-harrison-bader-thinks-he-was-meant-to-be-yankees/

https://www.youtube.com/watch?v=yOE6L5tKdY4 (Jonathan India interview begins at 1 hr, 33 mins)

https://www.youtube.com/watch?v=WiYtkyn1y7w&t=970s (portion on Weitzel begins at 13 min mark, show is Foul Territory podcast co-anchored by AJ Pierzynski)

https://www.youtube.com/watch?v=_kSdtYJy4d8 (Harrison Bader MLB Network interview after hitting 5 HRs in 2022 postseason)

Weitzel MLB Players as College Coach

Player	School	MLB Debut Year
Joe Grahe	Palm Beach State College	1990
Gar Finnvold	Palm Beach State College	1994
Sid Roberson	University of North Florida	1995
Todd Dunn	University of North Florida	1996
Brian Tollberg	University of North Florida	2003
Nick Maronde	University of Florida	2012
Paco Rodriguez	University of Florida	2012
Kevin Chapman	University of Florida	2013
Matt den Dekker	University of Florida	2013
Mike Zunino	University of Florida	2013
Anthony Desclafani	University of Florida	2014
Cole Figueroa	University of Florida	2014
Brian Johnson	University of Florida	2015
Preston Tucker	University of Florida	2015
Austin Maddox	University of Florida	2017
Nolan Fontana	University of Florida	2017
Harrison Bader	University of Florida	2017
Bobby Poyner	University of Florida	2018
Justin Shafer	University of Florida	2018
Eric Hanhold	University of Florida	2018
AJ Puk	University of Florida	2019
Shaun Anderson	University of Florida	2019
Richie Martin	University of Florida	2019
Pete Alonso	University of Florida	2019
Brady Singer	University of Florida	2020
Kirby Snead	University of Florida	2021
Jackson Kowar	University of Florida	2021
Taylor Gushue	University of Florida	2021
Jonathan India	University of Florida	2021
Danny Young	University of Florida	2022
Alex Faedo	University of Florida	2022
Dane Dunning	University of Florida	2022
Mark Kolozsvary	University of Florida	2022
Dalton Guthrie	University of Florida	2022
Jacob Young	University of Florida	2023

Weitzel MLB Players as Scout
Player	School	MLB Debut Year	Player	School	MLB Debut Year
AJ Pierzynski	Dr Phillips High School	1998	Jay Canizaro	Instructional League	1996
Doug Mientkiewicz	Florida State University	1998	Torii Hunter	Instructional League	1997
Greg "Boo" Mullins	St. Johns River State College (initially recruited to UNF by Weitzel)	1998	Jacque Jones	Instructional League	1999
Fred Rath	Thomas Jefferson High School	1998	Matthew LeCroy	Instructional League	2000
Cleatus Davidson	Lake Wales High School	1999	Luis Rivas	GCL Twins	2000
Dan Perkins	Westminster Christian School	1999	Andy Abad	Jupiter, FL American Legion	2001
Rob Radlosky	College of Central Florida	1999	Michael Cuddyer	Instructional League	2001
Lance Carter	State College of Florida	1999	Adam Johnson	GCL Twins	2001
Gus Gandarillas	University of Miami	2001	Juan Rincon	Instructional League	2001
Kevin Ohme	University of North Florida	2003	Mike Restovich	Instructional League	2002
Juan Padilla	Jacksonville University	2004	Mike Ryan	GCL Twins	2002
Tommy Watkins	Riverdale High School	2007	Rob Bowen	GCL Twins	2003
Jason Miller	Sarasota High School	2007	Justin Morneau	GCL Twins	2003
Steve Pearce	Indian River State College	2007	JD Durbin	GCL Twins	2004
Denard Span	Tampa Catholic High School	2008	Jason Kubel	GCL Twins	2004
Anthony Swarzak	Nova High School	2009	Joe Mauer	Instructional League	2004
Matt Fox	University of Central Florida	2010	Travis Bowyer	GCL Twins	2005
JD Martinez	Nova Southeastern University	2011	Peter Moylan	GCL Twins	2006
Mickey Storey	Florida Atlantic University	2012	Josh Rabe	Instructional League	2006
Chris Heston	Seminole State College	2014	Jose Morales	Instructional League	2007
			Brian Wolfe	Instructional League	2007
			Alex Romero	Instructional League	2008

Fielding % Under Weitzel at UF
Year	Fielding %
2008	0.963
2009	0.966
2010	0.978
2011	0.974
2012	0.977
2013	0.981
2014	0.976
2015	0.984
2016	0.982
2017	0.981
2018	0.977
2019	0.973

SEC Batting Average Under Weitzel
Year	Average
2008	0.305
2009	0.312
2010	0.289
2011	0.315
2012	0.257
2013	0.262
2014	0.277
2015	0.279
2016	0.27
2017	0.281
2018	0.273
2019	0.260

SEC Record Under Weitzel
Year	Wins	Losses
2008	17	13
2009	19	11
2010	22	8
2011	22	8
2012	18	12
2013	14	16
2014	21	9
2015	19	11
2016	19	10
2017	21	9
2018	20	10
2019	13	17
Total	225	134
