= Hedwig Ross =

Communist, teacher, editor (1900–1971)

Hedwig "Hettie" Ross (née Weitzel; 17 September 1900 – 26 October 1971) was a New Zealand-born Australian educator and political activist. She was a founding member of the Communist Party of New Zealand and a leader of the Australian Militant Woman's Group, a department of the Communist Party of Australia, and edited several Australian political publications including the Young Communist. Throughout her career, she was an advocate for the children of the poor, and argued for the centrality of education in raising their position in society.

== Early life ==
Ross was born Hedwig Weitzel on 17 September 1900 in New Zealand to German immigrants Friedrich Gustav Weitzel (a brassfounder and later a farmer) and Maria Benninghoven. The couple had three children born in Sydney between 1888 and 1891. As a schoolgirl in Wellington she witnessed the 1913 Great Strike of New Zealand, where workers from several industries protested against working conditions and unfair dismissals.

Weitzel was educated at Wellington Girls' College and went on to study at Victoria University College. In 1920, when she was nineteen years old, she completed after two years study a Bachelor of Arts degree in economics and philosophy. Future New Zealand Prime Minister Peter Fraser said in the New Zealand House of Representatives in 1921 that "she was wonderfully brilliant—brilliant enough to graduate before reaching the age of twenty." She would later return to receive a Diploma of Education at the University of Sydney.

== Political activity in New Zealand ==
In 1921, while studying at Wellington Teachers' College, Weitzel became a founding member of the Communist Party of New Zealand. During this period she was an associate of Fintan Patrick Walsh, a prominent member of the Federated Seaman's Union of New Zealand who led several large scale strikes during the 1920s. Walsh was also a co-founder of the Communist Party of New Zealand and he and Weitzel were rumoured to be lovers.

In August 1921, Weitzel's political activities led to her being convicted of selling seditious literature. She sold a copy of an Australian publication, the Communist, to an undercover policeman. It was future Prime Minister Peter Fraser, who was then a member of Parliament, who took up her case. Fraser had four years earlier been convicted of the same offense, and served twelve months jail time. He strongly believed that Weitzel, who he described as a "young girl on the threshold of womanhood," was a victim of unfair police officiousness, and declared to parliament that "the persecution of Miss Weitzel will rank in the history of New Zealand as one of the meanest and most contemptible episodes in our political life." However, Fraser's support failed to overrule Weitzel's conviction, and she was expelled from Wellington Teachers' College where she was studying for her Diploma of Education.

== Political and trade union activity in Australia ==
Her father died in 1917, and her mother and two siblings emigrated to the United States in 1921, but she had difficulty getting a passport to follow them. She moved to Sydney in 1922; in Australia her communist views were more openly acceptable.

She married Hector Ross in 1923. They divorced, childless, in 1931. She got a Diploma in Education from the University of Sydney in 1926 and taught in various Sydney schools until 1956 when she retired. She was active in the Communist Party and in the Woman Assistant Teachers Association of the Teachers Federation. She corresponded with Rewi Alley in China in 1956, and visited China in 1957. She suffered from Parkinson's disease in later life. She died 26 October 1971 at Mortdale, Sydney.
