= Wetzel =

Wetzel is the name of several persons, places, and other entities:

== List of people with the surname Wetzel ==
- Bernard C. Wetzel (1876–1952), American architect in Detroit
- Blaine Wetzel( (born 1986), American chef
- Carl Wetzel (born 1938), American hockey player
- Dan Wetzel, American writer and sports columnist
- David Wetzel (born ca. 1980?), American musician, member of the band Ghosty
- Donald Wetzel, American baseball player and inventor
- Friedrich Wetzel (1909–52), German Hauptsturmführer, mid-grade company level officer and equivalent of a captain in the German Army
- Gary George Wetzel (born 1947), American soldier, Medal of Honor recipient
- George P. Wetzel, Sr. (1921-2014), American legislator and jurist
- Jake Wetzel (born 1976), American-Canadian rower
- John Wetzel (basketball) (born 1944), American basketball player and coach
- John Wetzel (American football) (born 1991), professional American football player
- John Wetzel (Pennsylvania official), Pennsylvania Secretary of Corrections
- Julia Wetzel, American cryptologist with the National Security Administration
- Karl Friedrich Gottlob Wetzel (1779–1819), German writer
- Lewis Wetzel (1763–1808), American frontiersman
- Robert Lewis "Sam" Wetzel, American army officer
- Susanne Wetzel, German computer scientist
- Sylvia Wetzel (born 1949), German feminist
- Walter C. Wetzel (died 1945), American soldier, Medal of Honor recipient
- Wolfgang Wetzel (born 1968), German politician

== Other ==
- Wetzel County, West Virginia
- Wetzel, Michigan, an unincorporated community
- Wetzel's Pretzels, an American restaurant chain
- Wetzel's Climbing Mouse, Rhipidomys wetzeli, a species of mouse native to Venezuela.
