= A Chronicle of Ancient Sunlight =

Epic novel sequence by Henry Williamson

A Chronicle of Ancient Sunlight is the collective name for Henry Williamson's 15 novel series. First published between 1951 and 1969, the series follows the life of Phillip Maddison through the first half of the 20th century. Providing a social history for the time period 1893 to 1947 (including both World Wars), the series is partially inspired by Henry Williamson's own life. The 15 books total over 3 million words, just over 6,000 pages, and is considered one of the longest single works written in the English language.

== Series overview ==
A Chronicle of Ancient Sunlight : Series Overview
Book No.	Book Title	First Published	Page Count	Book Summary	Years Covered
01	The Dark Lantern	1951	432	The courtship and marriage of Richard Maddison and Hetty Turney	1893-1895
02	Donkey Boy	1952	400	Phillip Maddison - the early years	1897-1907
03	Young Phillip Maddison	1953	416	Youth's singing season - the schooldays of Phillip Maddison	1908-1913
04	How Dear is Life	1954	335	The last summer of the Old World and the First Battle of Ypres	1913-1914
05	A Fox Under My Cloak	1955	415	Fear and the Quest for Courage - 1915 and the time of Loos	1914-1915
06	The Golden Virgin	1957	448	The year of the Somme	1915-1916
07	Love and the Loveless	1958	384	Passchendale - A soldier's Tale	1916-1917
08	A Test to Destruction	1960	461	1918 with the Fifth Army in France - and the first aftermath of peace	1918
09	The Innocent Moon	1961	415	A romantic novel of the early nineteen-twenties, largely set in the West Country	1920-1924
10	It Was the Nightingale	1962	357	Phillip's loss of his first wife - and the search for a new happiness	1924-1926
11	The Power of the Dead	1963	365	Between two worlds - Phillip at the crossroads in the late twenties	1926-1929
12	The Phoenix Generation	1965	384	The troubled decade leading to the Second World War	1929-1939
13	A Solitary War	1966	374	Farming life and political suspicion in the opening months of the Second World War	1939-1940
14	Lucifer Before Sunrise	1967	515	A record of the effects of the Second World War on agricultural England	1940-1945
15	The Gale of the World	1969	364	The climax of the sequence, set in post-War North Devon	1946–1947

== Background ==
Henry Williamson wrote the final sentence of his series, 'A Chronicle of Ancient Sunlight' at 4.20pm on Sunday 11 February 1968. Overcome by emotion, he cried out words of grief and amazement. He considered the series his life's work, a 'War and Peace' of his time, which had taken him 30 years to start, and 20 years to complete, at times writing for 14 hours a day. Totaling over 3 million words, the series is considered one of the longest single works written in the English language.

The fifteen books span the time period 1893 to 1947, much of which contain autobiographical elements from Henry Williamson's own life translated into the fictional account of his character, Phillip Maddison.

Books 1-3 cover the courtship of Phillip's parents and his childhood in the London suburb of Lewisham and the nearby Hilly Fields (a plaque is located on Eastern Road, Lewisham to mark where Henry Williamson grew up). Books 4-8 cover Phillip's time served in The Great War, some experiences are drawn from Williamson's own War diaries and experiences, other battles from extensive research.

Books 9-11 and part of Book 12 cover Phillip's life in North Devon. Mirroring a version of Henry Williamson's life and writing career, as Phillip writes short nature stories (based on those Williamson wrote and published in The Peregrine's Saga (Collins 1923), and The Old Stag (Putnam 1926)), as well as finding literary success with a novel about an otter and a trout (versions of Williamson's own Tarka the Otter (Putnam 1927) and Salar the Salmon (Faber 1936)).

The second part of Book 12, and Books 13 and 14 follow Phillip's attempts to farm in Norfolk, also based on Williamson's own experiences, some of which were published in his non-fiction work, The Story of a Norfolk Farm (Faber 1941). Many pieces of the series were in fact recycled from parts of books Williamson had previously published, including segments used from Goodbye West Country (Putnam 1937), The Sun in the Sands (Faber 1945) and events/characters directly link with his earlier novel series The Flax of Dream (Collins 1921-1928).

Book 15 sets the climax of the series back in North Devon, where Phillip dreams to start writing his major novel series (a version of A Chronicle of Ancient Sunlight), and ends with a terrible storm and flood in Lynmouth based on the real-life 1952 event (though moved to 1947).

In parts of Books 12 to 15 Henry Williamson's own political beliefs are reflected in Phillip's, as he is a German sympathizer during World War II and joins a version of Oswald Mosley's British Union of Fascists. In an interview with Clive Gordon for the BBC Radio show Profile, Williamson agrees with Gordon that his great work had been neglected due to his politics.

== Series title ==
Interviewed on Desert Island Discs in 1969, Henry Williamson stated that the original working title for the series was A Chronicle of a Waste of Time, based on one of Shakespeare's sonnets. But that his publishers advised against it, as too many critics would take advantage of such a title.

The title of the series, A Chronicle of Ancient Sunlight is a reference to the works of naturalist writer, Richard Jefferies, in particular his 1883 book The Story of My Heart which had a profound effect on Williamson when he returned from the trenches. In A Story of My Heart Jefferies writes how the power of sunlight linked his soul with the past; "Gradually entering into the intense life of the summer days—a life which burned around as if every grass blade and leaf were a torch—I came to feel the long-drawn life of the earth back into the dimmest past, while the sun of the moment was warm on me. Sesostris on the most ancient sands of the south, in ancient, ancient days, was conscious of himself and of the sun. This sunlight linked me through the ages to that past consciousness. From all the ages my soul desired to take that soul-life which had flowed through them as the sunbeams had continually poured on earth".

== Books ==
The Dark Lantern
First published in 1951, the first book in the series covers the period 1893-1895. Largely set in a suburb of London (Lewisham), near the Crystal Palace, the story follows the courtship and secret marriage of Richard Maddison and Hetty Turney. Their financial struggles as they set up a home together despite objections of Hetty's imposing father, Thomas Turney. Ending with the birth of their son, Phillip Maddison.

Donkey Boy
First published in 1952, Donkey Boy covers the period 1897-1907 and describes the difficult childhood of Phillip Maddison on the outskirts of London. Historical events mentioned include Queen Victoria's Diamond Jubilee, the Boer War, Mafeking Day and the 1906 General Election.

Young Phillip Maddison
First published in 1953, Young Phillip Maddison details the teenage years of Phillip in the years 1908 to 1913. Describing his troubled relationship with his father, a growing passion for nature in the surrounding estates, involvement with school bullies, a boyhood gang and the Cub Scouts. Historical events mentioned, include; the death of King Edward VII, the coronation of King George V, Halley's Comet, the sinking of the Titanic.

How Dear is Life
First published in 1954, How Dear is Life is the 1st of 5 books which cover The Great War. Set between 1913 and 1914, the novel starts as Phillip gets his first job as a clerk in London, and at the outbreak of war joins the London Highland Territorials along with his school friends. The sense of adventure is shattered after the devastating Battle of Ypres.

A Fox Under My Cloak
First published in 1955, A Fox Under My Cloak is the 2nd book set during the First World War, covering the years 1914 to 1915. Phillip experiences trench life, and the 1914 Christmas Truce in which he meets many German soldiers that he sees as the everyday man like himself. During periods of convalescence, he struggles with life at home with the family. At the Battle of Loos, he meets an important, sympathetic role model, Captain ‘Spectre’ West. Other historical events mentioned, include the sinking of the Lusitania and the Suffragettes.

The Golden Virgin
First published in 1957, The Golden Virgin is the 3rd book covering the First World War, years 1915-1916. Phillip continues to struggle with his courage in the Battle of the Somme as well as his troubled behavior when at home. There is a devastating Zeppelin attack on London which involves Phillip's father (a Special Constable), and Phillip's love interest, Lily Cornford.

Love and the Loveless
First published in 1958, Love and the Loveless is the 4th book covering The First World War, years 1916-1917. Phillip struggles with his drinking, as he becomes a transport officer in charge of horses on the Passchendale battlefield.

A Test to Destruction
First published in 1960, A Test to Destruction is the fifth and final book covering The First World War, the year of 1918. We follow Phillip through the final battles with the Fifth Army in France, where he is temporarily blinded by gas. The War comes to an end, and Phillip struggles to settle back into life at home, with scenes of terrible family feuds.

The Innocent Moon
First published in 1961, we see Phillip move to Devon where he follows his dream to become a writer of nature stories in the years 1920-1924. Spending time with an eccentric friend (Julian Warbeck), and his cousin Willy (where events cross-over with Williamson's other work, 'The Pathway' (1928). Phillip has a number of romances, and believes he has found his soulmate in a girl named Barley.

It Was the Nightingale
First published in 1962, and set in the years 1924-1926, we follow Phillip as he copes with the tragic death of his first wife during childbirth, and searches for happiness in Devon and on the London Literary scene.

The Power of the Dead
First published in 1963, The Power of the Dead covers 1926-1929. Phillip starts a new life in Devon with his second wife, Lucy, but lives in two worlds between the living and the dead. He at last reaches literary fame with the publication of his otter book (a version of Tarka the Otter), and attempts farm management with his Uncle Hilary.

The Phoenix Generation
First published in 1965, The Phoenix Generation covers a ten-year period, from 1929 to 1939. Phillip's love life becomes complicated as he seeks solace with young mistresses. He publishes another literary success (a version of Salar the Salmon). As the Second World War looms on the horizon, Phillip's controversial sympathies with Germany lead him to join Hereward Birkin's Imperial Socialist Party (a version of Oswald Mosley and the British Union of Fascists). With ideas of National renewal, he moves his growing family to Norfolk to attempt farming. Historical events described include Ramsay MacDonald's General Election, Silver Jubilee and death of King George V, Nuremberg Rally, and the burning down of The Crystal Palace.

A Solitary War
First published in 1966, A Solitary War covers the first two years of World War Two from 1939 to 1940. Phillip struggles to make his derelict Norfolk Farm work amidst political tensions with the local villagers, and an unhappy married life. Historical events described include The Battle of Britain, Broadcasts of Lord Haw Haw, Winston Churchill's emergence as Prime Minister, Germany entering Paris, London Blitz.

Lucifer Before Sunrise
First published in 1967, Lucifer Before Sunrise covers the final years of the Second World War, from 1940 to 1945. Phillip continues to cause controversy in the local Norfolk village with his political views and farming techniques. His family life begins to disintegrate, and his first born son, Billy joins the R.A.F. Historical events described include Dresden bombings, the Fall of Singapore, D-Day.

The Gale of the World
First published in 1969, Gale of the World is the final and 15th book of 'A Chronicle of Ancient Sunlight'. Set in the post-War period of 1946-1947, Phillip now lives a reclusive life on Exmoor, North Devon. With ailing eyesight he wishes to start his giant novel series, and attempts a reconciliation with his family. Depicted in the novel is the devastating Lynmouth flood (moved from 1952 to 1947).

== Main characters ==
FAMILY

Phillip Maddison The main protagonist of the series, Phillip is born in 1895 at the end of the first novel

Richard Maddison Phillip's father
Hetty Maddison/Turney Phillip's mother
Mavis Elizabeth Maddison Phillip's sister
Doris Maddison Phillip's younger sister
Thomas Turney Phillip's Grandfather / Hetty's father
Hugh Turney Phillip's Uncle / Hetty's Sister
Dora Maddison Phillip's Aunt / Richard's sister (a suffragette)
Hillary Maddison Phillip's Uncle / Richard's brother
Willy Maddison Phillip's cousin - who also features in Henry Williamson's The Flax of Dream novel series
Percy Maddison Phillip's cousin
Hubert Cakebread Phillip's cousin
Polly Pickering Phillip's cousin
Barley Lushington/Maddison Phillip's first wife
Lucy Copleston/Maddison Phillip's second wife
Billy Maddison Phillip's first son

CHILDHOOD NEIGHBOURS & FRIENDS
Mrs Neville, Desmond Neville, Horace Cranmer, Tom Chin, Peter Wallace

WORLD WAR I
Captain ‘Spectre’ West, Bill Kidd, Teddy Pinnegar, Major Downham, Father Aloysius, Captain 'All Weather' Jack Hobart

LOVE INTERESTS
Helena Rolls, Lily Cornford, Melissa Watt-Wilby, Molly and Miranda Bucentaur, Laura Wissilcraft,

MISCELLANEOUS
Ernest and Tim Copleston Brother-in-laws
Julian Warbeck Friend
Piers Tofield Friend
Horatio Bugg A local nuisance near his Norfolk farm
Hereward Birkin A version of Sir Oswald Mosley
Buster Cloudesley Friend and Pilot

== Publication history ==
1951-1969 Books 1 to 15 were first published in hardback by Macdonald, featuring dust jacket artwork by James Broom-Lynne (1916-1995)
1962-1969 Books 1 to 13 only were published in paperback by Panther
1984-1985 Books 1 to 4 only were published in paperback by Zenith
1984-1985 Books 1 to 15 were re-printed in hardback by Macdonald
1994-1999 Books 1 to 15 published in paperback by Sutton
2014 Books 1 to 15 published by Faber Finds in paperback and ebook

== Critical response ==
Anthony Burgess included the novel series in his book Ninety-Nine Novels : The Best in English Since 1939. Burgess states that "in general, the sequence has failed to engage the critical and public attention it merits. This has something to do, undoubtedly, with Williamson's political stance". Burgess describes Williamson's writing as "at times almost unbearably poignant" and that "Williamson's style is romantic, though rarely sentimental". He describes the volumes covering World War I as "one of the most encyclopedic fictional accounts we have", but that the later pro-Fascist tone is "highly disturbing, and (there is) an almost manic bitterness which is far from acceptable".

"This, remember, is “chronicle”, its effect is achieved by narration supported by fact, without attempt to concoct dramatic moments, and it is all the more powerful for that. [This book] puts Mr. Williamson, as a writer on the First World War, where his “Tarka the Otter” put him as a nature-writer – in the first rank".
Phyllis Young (The Bookseller, Yorkshire Post - November 1958)

"Mr. Williamson paints in loving, meticulous detail all the rich and varied Victorian scene...Equally detailed are the many exquisite descriptions of birds and butterflies, the streets of London and the beauty of the outer suburbs. The nature writing betrays fine poetic sensitivity and all the many characters are vitally alive...Mr. Williamson reveals the perplexities and intimacies of their domestic life with candour, tenderness, and a deep insight into the complex emotions that sway the human heart. Infused throughout by a passionate sincerity this novel has all the quality of greatness in it, and as an interpretation of life rings true in every line".
Oxford Mail (S. P. B. Mais), 29 November 1951

"Henry Williamson's "A Chronicle of Ancient Sunlight" at last draws to its close. Both the social and the literary historian of the past 50 years can dredge from this vast serpentine roman fleuve innumerable treasures. Its flawed hero, Phillip Maddison, so arrogant, so vain, so domineering, is yet endowed with a surprising gift of tenderness towards anyone elevated to the privileged rank of comrade. In him Mr. Williamson has produced one of those fictional characters who have far more solidity than most of the people one encounters in real life. A masterpiece then? Alas, no. In this volume there are, as in all its predecessors, stagnant reaches of triviality beside those areas where the tide of narrative sweeps along deep, swift and clear. Uncomfortably one never ceases to be aware that the author is always working close to the diaries from which he even makes intermittent quotations; and one wonders, as the insignificant is piled on the inconsequential, whether he would not have done better merely to trust to the selectivity of memory. Yet, given some dramatic convulsion of nature – in this volume a flood in the West Country – or some no less dramatic convulsion in the life of his love-battered hero, Mr. Williamson is incomparable among modern novelists."
Sunday Telegraph (Francis King), 8 June 1969
