= Scandaroon =

Scandaroon or Scanderoon is an archaic English language name for the city of İskenderun in Turkey.

It may also refer to:

- the Scandaroon pigeon
- The Scandaroon (novel), a 1972 novel by Henry Williamson
- Scandaroon, a board game
