= William Kermode =

Australian artist (1895–1959)

- Born: 1895; Hobart, Tasmania, Australia
- Died: 1959 (aged 63–64); Ashford, Kent, England

William A. Kermode MC (1895–1959) was an Australian artist. He illustrated Henry Williamson's The Patriot's Progress, published in 1930, with linocuts.

William Kermode was born in Hobart, Tasmania in 1895. During the First World War he served on the Western Front with the British Army, being awarded the Military Cross. Post-war he maintained a studio in Pimlico, London. He died in 1959, aged 64.

== Biography ==
William A. Kermode was born in Hobart, Tasmania, where his family were among the early landowners. He probably came to England in 1911. He fought in the British Army, during the First World War 1914–18 and was awarded the Military Cross for Gallantry. In the Second World War he served as Observer Corps Liaison Officer at Fighter Command Headquarters, Uxbridge.

He died aged 64 in Ashford Hospital, Kent.

== Education and career ==
Kermode studied at Iain Macnab's Grosvenor School of Modern Art, probably between 1925 and 1928, and exhibited linocuts at the first British exhibition of the medium at the Redfern Gallery, London, in 1929. He designed posters for the London Underground in 1924 including "Leave this and Move to Edgware" printed by the Westminster Press. In 1928 Kermode was introduced to Henry Williamson by the well-known literary critic Sir John (Jack) Squire. Kermode had made linocuts from his war experiences and wanted someone to write short caption-like paragraphs. The result was the highly acclaimed The Patriot's Progress, today considered as an important contribution to the literature of World War I. Kermode also provided a cover design for a cheap edition of Tarka the Otter, published in 1929. He is also known to have illustrated The Specialist by Charles Sale and Moscow Has a Plan by M. Ilin (Jonathan Cape, 1931).

Kermode wrote on the subject of colour linocuts applied to advertising and made a number of independent linocuts in monochrome from about 1920, in small editions. He published Drawing on Scraperboard for Beginners in 1938. A fact of Kermode's work, as yet undocumented and largely ignored, is the variety of birding covers and dust wrappers which he designed, some from linocut and many bearing the simple initial "K". Sybil Andrews attended a lecture and demonstration by William Kermode on wood-block printing at Heatherley's School of Art, London in the 20s. A short obituary following his death and written by Owen Rowley appeared on page 12 of The Times on Thursday 5 February 1959.

=== The Life Saver ===
The Life Saver is a limited edition (of 25) original linocut measuring 40.5 x 30.4cm signed in pencil by William Kermode. The print depicts a man sitting on the deck of boat, wearing a garment that reads "RNLI". It is recorded in the National Gallery of Australia, alongside some of his other work, although no copy of it exists there. It is also recorded at being exhibited at the 7th International Print Makers Exhibition 2 March- 4 April at the Los Angeles Museum in 1926. Previous owners include A.M. Hind for the Contemporary Arts Society before being presented to the Prints and Drawings Department of the British Museum of London in 1936. A copy is known to be owned privately.
