= After London =

1885 science fiction novel

After London; Or, Wild England
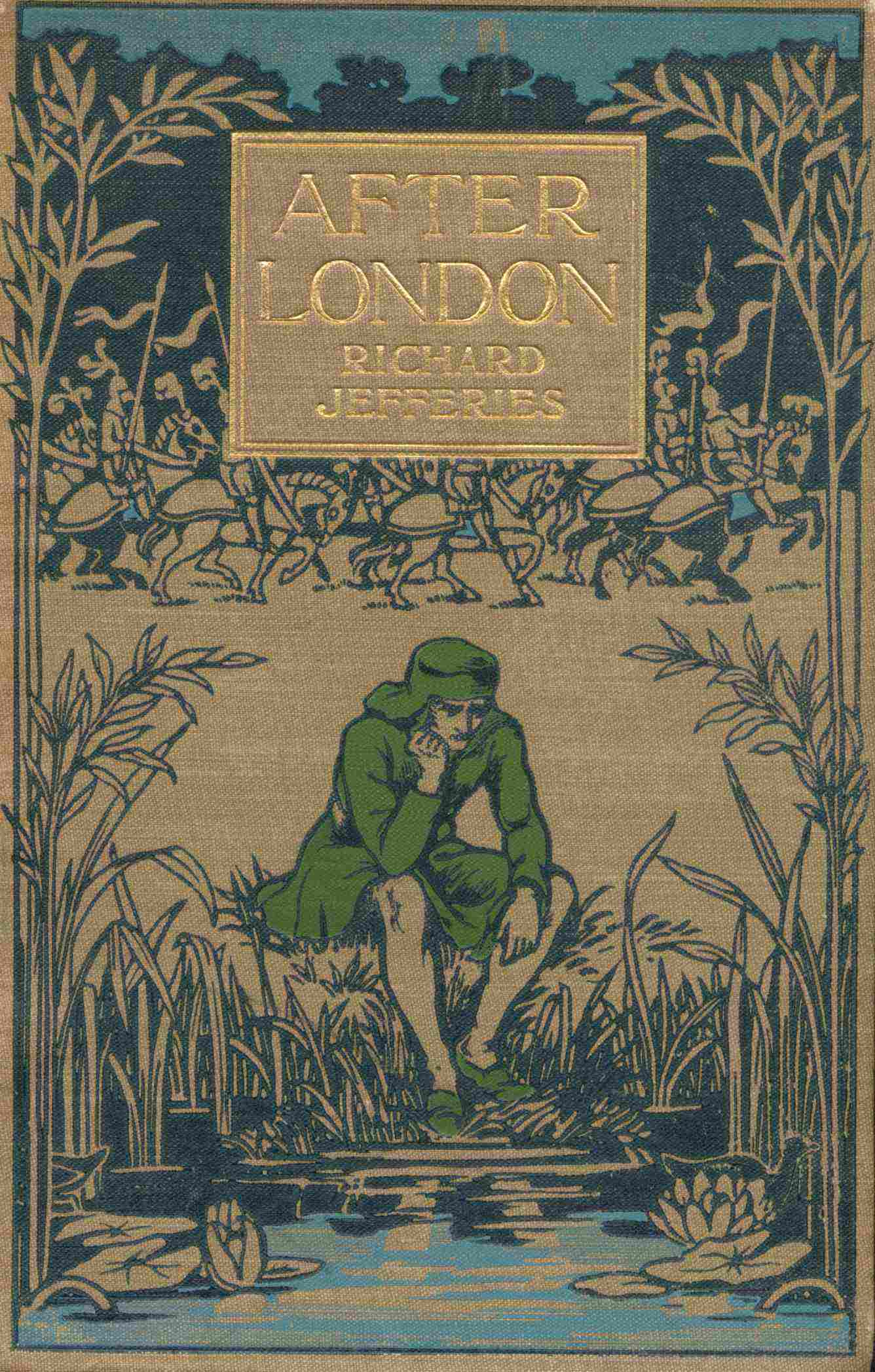
- Cover of the 1905 edition
- Author: Richard Jefferies
- Language: English
- Genre: Science fiction
- Publisher: Cassell and Company
- Publication date: 1885
- Publication place: United Kingdom

After London; Or, Wild England: In Two Parts: Part 1 – The Relapse into Barbarism; Part II – Wild England is a novel by Richard Jefferies, published in 1885 by Cassell and Company. It is an early work of science fiction, set in near future England, near sunk London, a century after a mysterious disaster caused the fall of modern civilization and reverted English society to the medieval level.

== History ==
It is likely the original draft of the novel was much longer, and that it was cut from three volumes to a single one due to publisher's demand.

== Plot summary ==
The book has two parts. The first five chapters, in the section entitled "The Relapse into Barbarism", purport to be the account of the fall of civilisation after "the passage of an enormous dark body through space" has tilted the Earth's axis. Set a century or so after the disaster, it portrays the consequences, with a description of nature reclaiming England: farmers' fields becoming overrun by forest, domesticated animals running wild, roads and towns filled with decaying buildings and overgrowth, and the city of London reverting to lake and poisonous swampland. The society described in the novel is dystopian and medieval; much of the populace are either illiterate peasants or slaves living under the rule of a corrupt nobility.

The second, much longer part, "Wild England", consisting of 28 chapters, is largely a straightforward adventure featuring an aristocratic protagonist, Felix Aquila, set many years later in the wild landscape and society. Aquila, the second son of a nobleman, falls in love and sets out on an expedition to find his fortune. He eventually becomes the leader of a band of tribal, nomadic shepherds.

== Reception ==
The work was a popular novel in its time, although "contemporary critics were generally confused and disappointed by the book's conclusion" and preferred its first part. Critics dissatisfied with the second part often make an exception of chapters 22–24, which go beyond recreation of a medieval world to give a disturbing and surreal description of the site of the fallen city. The novel was criticized, in particular, by an early biographer of Jefferies, Walter Besant, but praised by another, Q. D. Leavis.

The work also received more modern reviews; most recently following a new edition (by Edinburgh University Press, 2017). Maria Longley reviewed it for the Greenspace Information for Greater London. She felt that "the human elements of the novel haven't stood the test of time" but positively commented on the "carefully observed wildlife descriptions", writing that she "loved the imagining of a wilder England".

Michael Dirda reviewed it for The Washington Post. He considered the "Dantesque" chapters in which the protagonists explores the remains of London "brilliantly imagined" and "the high point of Jefferies's book", comparing them to "the phantasmagoric final chapters of Poe's "Narrative of Arthur Gordon Pym" or the terminal vision of the world's end in H.G. Wells's "The Time Machine".

Violet Hudson reviewed it for The Times Literary Supplement, referring to it as "Jefferies's... great novel", praising his "floridly beautiful world".

Mark Frost, in his introduction to the 2017 edition, wrote that the book "can often dazzle, sometimes infuriate, and always intrigue".

John Eggeling and John Clute describe the book as "an important example of Victorian s[cience] f[iction]"; similarly, Darko Suvin referred to it as "a near masterpiece of Victorian SF".

== Analysis ==
The novel has been subject to numerous scholarly analyses. Mark Frost noted that the book is "gaining an ever more prominent place in studies of Victorian culture".

Many analyses of the book focused on its theme of destroyed London. Oliver Lindner, for example, looked at how the novel portrays the author's "pessimistic outlook on the future of the city".

The book has been described as difficult to categorize, particularly in the context of 19th century works, as it is unlike most of the works of its time. Frost wrote that the work "overspills its various generic and thematic categorisations, and is happily unlike any other book", calling it an experimental novel, and later noting that the main themes of the novel are "science fiction, dystopia, Darwinism, romance, national identity, naturalism, and pastoral". The novel is composed of two distinct parts; the first, according to Plotz, features "naturalist writing in the vein of Gilbert White", whereas the second has a more traditional quest structure. It has been called a defining work for the apocalyptic Ruined Earth genre, the disaster novel genre, the climate fiction genre, and the anthropocene fiction genre. It has also been described as related to time travel and catastrophe fiction genres, as well as a science fiction dystopia, and received a number of less common descriptions. Its setting has also been described as related to pastoral fiction; however, it is far from idyllic, portraying various scenes of savagery and barbarism. Frost suggested that it might be better described as an anti-pastoral fiction. Sarita Olga Mizin noted similarities to the lost world genre, in its detailed description of the new locations and creatures. John Plotz saw the novel as an early example of naturalist fiction.

Caroline Sumpter argued that Jefferies's novel was significantly influenced by the thought of Machiavelli. In turn, the book has been influential on a number of works, such as utopian romances such as William Henry Hudson's "A Crystal Age", (1887), the better known William Morris's News from Nowhere (1890), and M.P. Shiel's post-apocalyptic novel, The Purple Cloud (1901). Although Jefferies's novel has inspired a number of utopias, the work itself is not a utopia.

Sumpter sees the novel as questioning the very notion of progress, questioning some earlier critics views that the book endorses revolutionary vision of progressive history. Similarly, Lidner wrote that the book "represents the bleakest prediction" about humanity's future in contemporary literature, and was "a thorough shattering of the Victorian beliefs in progress and technology". Frost, less strongly, observes that the work is "a powerful register of decidedly mixed feelings about Victorian humanity". Adrian Tait wrote that the novel, while concerned with the consequences of technological progress, stops short of being a warning of things to come, dwelling on the disaster brought by it, or predicting an impending and inevitable doom.

Kübra Baysal, writing in 2023, noted that the novel still has value for modern readers, as an example of an early work discussing ecological and sociological implications of anthropocenic change in the form of a warning about destruction brought by human civilization. Likewise, others have situated the book in the context of early ecocriticial literature, given its focus on nature reclaiming formerly urbanized parts of the land. Mizin, however, points out that the state of nature is not romanticized in the novel, and in fact it is portrayed as dangerous to humans.

Michael Kramp analyzed the main hero of the novel, Felix Aquila, through the lenses of feminist theory.

== Bibliography ==
- John Fowles, "Introduction", in R. Jefferies, After London (Oxford: OUP, 1980), vii–xxi. ISBN 0-19-281266-1
- E. Thomas, Richard Jefferies: His Life and Work (London: Hutchinson, 1909).
- G. Miller and H. Matthews, Richard Jefferies, A bibliographical study (Aldershot: Scolar Press, 1993). ISBN 0-85967-918-7
