= The Patriot's Progress =

1930 novel by Henry Williamson

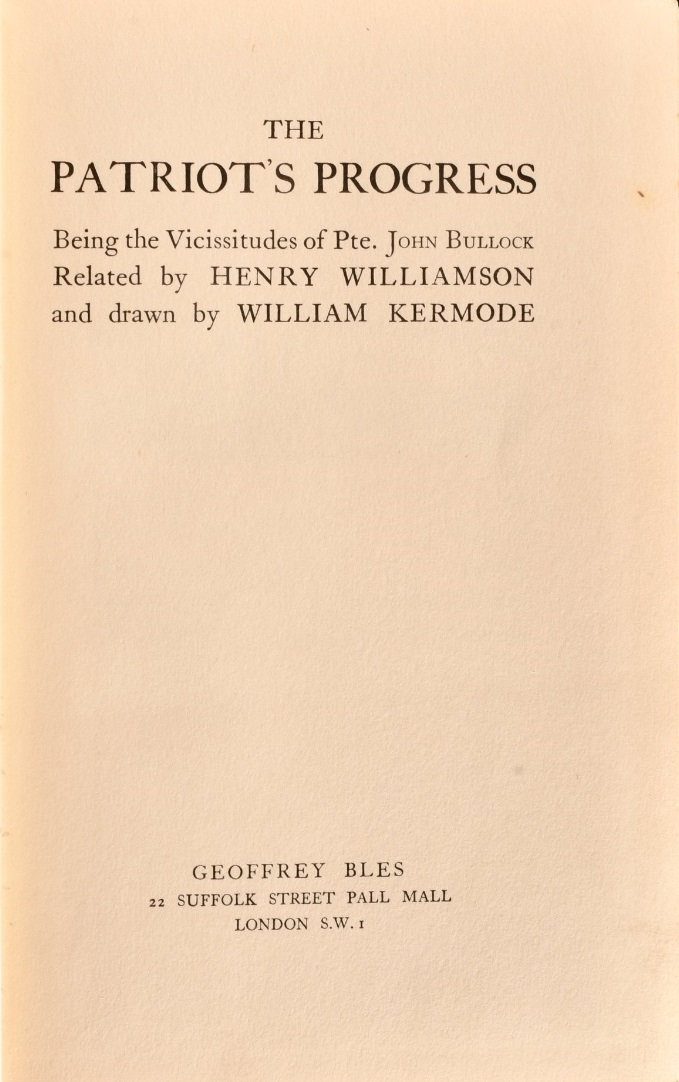
- Author: Henry Williamson
- Illustrator: William Kermode
- Language: English
- Subject: World War I
- Publisher: Geoffrey Bles
- Publication date: 12 May 1930
- Publication place: United Kingdom
- Pages: 194

The Patriot's Progress is a 1930 novel by the English writer Henry Williamson. It follows an English soldier during World War I and features linocut illustrations by William Kermode. Williamson disliked writing the book and it had a lukewarm reception upon the initial publication, appearing at the end of a boom of British World War I novels. Later analyses have highlighted its use of irony and rejection of conventions for plot construction and characterisation of the war.

== Background ==
The English writer Henry Williamson served on the Western Front during World War I, participating in almost every major battle the British Army fought in. The initiative to The Patriot's Progress came from J. C. Squire, who suggested that Williamson could write something to accompany a series of linocuts with World War I subjects by William Kermode. Williamson later described the work as tedious and unpleasant, and as something that took time from other World War I stories he intended to write. He worked on the project sporadically. At one point he abandoned it for a year out of disgust for the success of All Quiet on the Western Front (1928), a novel he deemed to be a fake portrayal of front life, where the author Erich Maria Remarque's lack of experience is revealed by his inability to grasp how war becomes endurable by the metamorphosis soldiers go through.

The title The Patriot's Progress references The Pilgrim's Progress by John Bunyan. The full title is a play on old conventions for long, bucolic titles and is intended as a contrast to the content: The Patriot's Progress: Being the Vicissitudes of Pte. John Bullock: Related by Henry Williamson and drawn by William Kermode. The main character's name John Bullock is a reference to John Bull, a personification of the United Kingdom.

== Plot ==
The novel follows the English everyman John Bullock as a soldier during World War I. The story has five phases. First, John leaves his clerk job in London and enlists in the army, inspired by mass media. He is then initiated in the life of trench warfare, which he finds both exhausting and enjoyable. The third phase concerns the battle of the Somme, where almost everybody in John's battalion dies. The fourth phase is about the third battle of Ypres the next summer. John has turned bitter, nearly dies in the battle and loses his leg. In the final phase, he returns to London, where he settles, becomes overweight and thinks nothing of the war.

== Reception ==
The Patriot's Progress appeared at the end of a boom of British World War I novels, when especially anti-heroic novels with gory details were facing a backlash. Its reception was generally lukewarm and The Times Literary Supplement wrote that it offered little new. It received praise from Arnold Bennett and T. E. Lawrence. A new edition appeared in 1968.

In 1990, John Onions grouped The Patriot's Progress with Richard Aldington's Death of a Hero (1929) and Roads to Glory (1930), writing that the three books satirise human folly through portrayals of supposed World War I heroes. Onions wrote that The Patriot's Progress has similarities with In Parenthesis by David Jones, but differs in how John Bullock is portrayed entirely as a product of circumstances and propaganda, with no individuality or stature, and the protagonist's own reflections are full of Williamson's irony.

Steven Trout wrote in 1993 that The Patriot's Progress "deserves more credit for originality" and a place "among more celebrated works ... in our canon of First-World-War literature". Trout wrote that Williamson captured the chaos of World War I by introducing new ways to break conventions of plot causality, necessarily omitting character development, geopolitics and attempts to portray the war as an "inevitable tragedy". Trout wrote that whereas Remarque's All Quiet on the Western Front, Aldington's Death of a Hero and Frederic Manning's The Middle Parts of Fortune (1928) feature protagonists who are more sensitive and articulate than other soldiers, which can be seen as self-projections from authors with little actual war experience, John Bullock is an unintellectual common soldier. At the end of the novel, the character returns to the "dehumanizing system" in which he began, with the loss of a leg as the only major difference.

In her 2025 book Writing Noise in Interwar Britain, Anna Smith likened the novel's frequent use of onomatopoeia to that in Zang Tumb Tumb by Filippo Tommaso Marinetti. She wrote that where Marinetti used war sounds to create a dehumanised sensory experience, Williamson created a sense of mortal danger.
