= The Phasian Bird =

1948 novel by Henry Williamson

- Title page for The Phasian Bird (1948)
- Author: Henry Williamson
- Language: English
- Publisher: Faber and Faber
- Publication date: 1948
- Publication place: United Kingdom
- Pages: 341

The Phasian Bird is a 1948 novel by the English writer Henry Williamson.

== Plot ==
Set in Norfolk during World War II, the novel interweaves the stories of a hybrid pheasant and an artist-turned-farmer who experiments with new cultivation methods.

== Reception ==
Kirkus Reviews wrote that "Mr. Williamson writes knowingly but without any particular stimulation and his story rarely comes to life". Nature wrote that Williamson used his "well-known vivid style" in "a picture of endless effort to cultivate the stern land, of despair and bitter frustration, of endurance and grim determination that win through".
