= The Scandaroon (novel) =

1972 novel by Henry Williamson

- Author: Henry Williamson
- Illustrator: Ken Lilly
- Language: English
- Publisher: Macdonald & Co
- Publication date: 1972
- Publication place: United Kingdom
- Pages: 152

The Scandaroon is a 1972 novel by the English writer Henry Williamson. It is set in a Devon village in the 1920s and is about people who raise and train homing pigeons and participate in pigeon racing, as a rare Scandaroon pigeon arrives. It was Williamson's last novel.

Kirkus Reviews called it a "discreetly atmospheric book" with a "wealth of information and pleasing lyrical tributes to the birds and their handsome enemies -- the hawks".
