= Graeme Maxton =

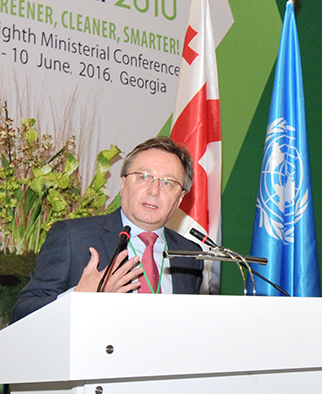
- Graeme Maxton at 8th Environment for Europe Ministerial Conference 9 June 2016, Batumi, Georgia
- Born: Edinburgh, Scotland, United Kingdom
- Occupations: Economist and writer

Graeme Maxton is a British climate change economist and writer.

== Biography ==
Maxton was born in Edinburgh, Scotland. Until 2018, he was the Secretary General of the Club of Rome based in Switzerland. He was previously regional director of the Economist Intelligence Unit in Asia, worked for Booz Allen Hamilton, Citigroup and American Express and was a visiting professor at Bayes Business School between 1988 and 2002.

== Works ==
Maxton is the author of Follies of the Western Mind, Letters from my Uncle (Arktos Books 2025), co-author with Dr Bernice Maxton-Lee of A Chicken Can’t Lay a Duck Egg (Changemakers Books 2020) and of Globaler Klimanotstand: Warum unser demokratisches System an seine Grenzen stößt (Komplett-Media 2020). Maxton is also the author of the German best-seller Change! Warum wir eine radikale Wende brauchen. The book examines the link between the economic system and climate change and has also been published in English and Slovak.

Maxton is the co-author with Jorgen Randers of Reinventing Prosperity. The book has been published in German (" Ein Prozent ist genug", oekom 2016), Italian and Ukrainian.

Maxton is the author of The End of Progress, How Modern Economics Has Failed Us which was nominated for the Financial Times and Goldman Sachs Business Book of the Year Award. The book has been translated into Chinese, Czech, Romanian and German (Die Wachstumslüge), where it became a Spiegel top-20 best seller.

Maxton's books on the automotive industry, co-written with John Wormald, include Time for a Model Change, which was Cambridge University Press's Feature Book of the Year in 2004 and Driving Over a Cliff, also nominated for the Financial Times Business Book of the Year Award.

Maxton is a regular contributor to the South China Morning Post and a number of other online and print publications.

Maxton provided the afterword for 2021 book Wild Life about the Victorian nature writer from Swindon Richard Jefferies.

== Bibliography ==
- Maxton, Graeme (2025). Follies of the Western Mind, Letters from my Uncle. London: Arktos. ISBN 978-1917646574.
- Maxton, Graeme (2020). Sliepka nedokáže zniesť kačacie vajce:COVID-19 ako šanca na riešenie klimatickej krízy (in Slovak). Bratislava: PRO. ISBN 978-80-89057-87-0.
- Maxton, Graeme (2020). Slepice nedokáže snést kachní vejce (in Czech). Prague: PRO. ISBN 978-1789047615.
- Maxton, Graeme (2020). A Chicken can't lay a Duck Egg: How Covid-19 can solve the climate crisis. Washington DC: Changemakers Books. ISBN 978-1789047615.
- Maxton, Graeme (2020). Globaler Klimanotstand: Warum unser demokratisches System an seine Grenzen stößt (in German). München: Komplett Media. ISBN 978-3-8312-0558-5.
- Maxton, Graeme (2018). Change! : Warum wir eine radikale Wende brauchen (in German). Grünwald: Komplett Media. ISBN 978-3865818102. OCLC 1057662866.
- Maxton, Graeme (2016). Ein Prozent ist genug : Mit wenig Wachstum soziale Ungleichheit, Arbeitslosigkeit und Klimawandel bekämpfen : a report to the Club of Rome (in German). München: oekom Verlag. ISBN 978-1-77164-251-4.
  - Maxton, Graeme (2016). Reinventing prosperity: managing economic growth to reduce unemployment, inequality, and climate change: a report to the Club of Rome. Vancouver, British Columbia Berkeley: Greystone Books. ISBN 978-1-77164-251-4. OCLC 958271548.
- Die Wachstumslüge: Warum wir alle die Welt nicht länger Politikern und Ökonomen überlassen dürfen, Münchner Verlagsgruppe GmbH, 2012
- Maxton, Graeme (2011). The end of progress : how modern economics has failed us. Singapore: John Wiley & Sons (Asia) Pet. Ltd. ISBN 978-0-470-82998-1. OCLC 768570037.
- Maxton, Graeme (2004). Time for a model change : re-engineering the global automotive industry. Cambridge, UK New York: Cambridge University Press. ISBN 978-0-521-83715-6. OCLC 667102439.
- Maxton, Graeme (1995). Driving over a cliff? : business lessons from the world's car industry. London Wokingham, England Reading, Mass: Economist Intelligence Unit Addison-Wesley Pub. ISBN 978-0-201-59392-1. OCLC 31331440.
