= James Cox (labourer) =

English office worker

Cox in 1921

James Cox (11 October 1846, in Snodshill in Chiseldon, Wiltshire, England – 19 July 1925, in Greytown, New Zealand) was an English office worker and later a New Zealand flax worker, swagman (itinerant labourer), and agricultural worker. He is remembered because of his extensive diary.

Cox was the son of a prosperous small farmer. He became a clerical assistant for the Great Western Railway Company. When in 1880 his mother sold the family farm (Cox was then 34, single, and living with his mother), he emigrated from England to New Zealand, living in Christchurch, New Zealand until 1888 and thereafter in the North Island, where he worked in a flax mill. The mill closed in 1890 and thereafter Cox lived a hand-to-mouth existence, a hard life of vagrancy, intermittent and arduous labour, and poverty. He was buried in an unmarked grave, but a headstone was placed for him at Greytown Cemetery in 2013.

After 1888, he kept a very detailed diary, the surviving portion being about 800,000 words. The diary offers a unique and valuable account of New Zealand working class life of the period. Miles Fairburn wrote a 1995 book, Nearly Out of Heart and Hope, based on Cox's diaries. Cox's dairies were featured in the 2013 exhibition "Logs to blogs" at the Alexander Turnbull Library in Wellington.

Cox was the cousin of nature writer Richard Jefferies; as teens, Cox and Jefferies set off on an unsuccessful adventure, first planning to walk to Moscow and, this having failed, to sail to America, which also proved impossible.
