= The Flax of Dream =

Series of novels by Henry Williamson

- The Beautiful Years; Dandelion Days; The Dream of Fair Women; The Pathway
- Author: Henry Williamson
- Country: United Kingdom
- Language: English
- Publisher: Faber & Faber
- Published: 1921–1928

The Flax of Dream is a novel tetralogy by the English writer Henry Williamson. It portrays Willie Maddison and his career in rural Devon, as he tries to write a book about spiritual and political renewal, and during World War I.

The novels are partially autobiographical; Williamson described Maddison as his "brother". The series was influenced by the works of the nature writer Richard Jefferies, both stylistically and in its pantheistic themes.

The series consists of The Beautiful Years (1921), Dandelion Days (1922), The Dream of Fair Women: A Tale of Youth after the Great War (1924) and The Pathway (1928). It was first published in a single volume in 1936.
