= Greenspace Information for Greater London =

Greenspace Information for Greater London (GiGL) is the environmental record centre for Greater London. It collates information about wildlife, parks, nature reserves, gardens and other open spaces, and makes it available to partner organisations and environmental consultants through its website. Public access to the website is restricted to information not considered sensitive. GiGL works with over 50 partner organisations in London.

== History ==
GiGL began as the London Biological Recording Project in 1996, and then became the capital's environmental record centre in 2006. In 2013 it became a community interest company.

== Website ==
GiGL's website was developed by the National Biodiversity Network. It incorporated the Scottish Natural Heritage's WIMBY (What's in my back yard) tool, which allows users to search for species by location.

Up to 2010, details of Sites of Importance for Nature Conservation (SINC's) in London were available on the Mayor of London's Wildweb website. This was taken down in December 2010, and the database was transferred to GiGL, which launched its iGiGL site in spring 2012. Unlike Wildweb, sites which are not publicly accessible were excluded. iGiGL has now been replaced by Discover-London, the online data portal of the capital’s environmental records centre where the public can explore London’s parks, nature reserves, gardens and other open spaces.
