= Salar the Salmon =

1935 novel by Henry Williamson

- Title page for Salar the Salmon (1938 edition)
- Author: Henry Williamson
- Language: English
- Publisher: Faber & Faber
- Publication date: 1935
- Publication place: United Kingdom
- Pages: 520

Salar the Salmon is a 1935 novel by the English writer Henry Williamson. It follows a five-year-old salmon during his spring run, as he enters the Bristol Channel and ends up in Exmoor.

Kirkus Reviews wrote: "There is no humanizing of the salmon, no fantasy element, but simply a dramatic story of what one feels actually happens from the time a salmon deserts his Atlantic feeding grounds for the inland waterways." Peter Coates, in his book Salmon (2006), called it "the finest salmon novel in English".
