= Richard Jefferies =

English nature writer (1848–1887)

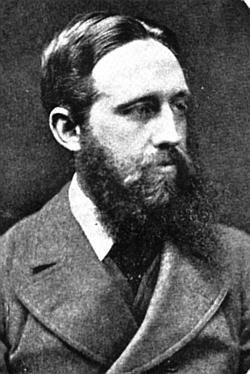
- Richard Jefferies
- Born: 6 November 1848; Coate, Swindon, Wiltshire, England
- Died: 14 August 1887 (aged 38); Goring-by-Sea, Worthing, Sussex, England
- Occupation: Writer (novel)
- Writing career
- Period: 19th century
- Genre: Nature writing

John Richard Jefferies (6 November 1848 – 14 August 1887) was an English nature writer, noted for his depiction of English rural life in essays, books of natural history, and novels. His childhood on a small Wiltshire farm had a great influence on him and provides the background to all his major works of fiction.

Jefferies's corpus of writings covers a range of genres and topics, including Bevis (1882), a classic children's book, and After London (1885), a work of science fiction. For much of his adult life he suffered from tuberculosis, and his struggles with the illness and with poverty also play a role in his writing. Jefferies valued and cultivated an intensity of feeling in his experience of the world around him, a cultivation that he describes in detail in The Story of My Heart (1883). This work, an introspective depiction of his thoughts and feelings about the world, gained him the reputation of a nature mystic at the time, but it is his success in conveying his awareness of nature and people within it, both in his fiction and in essay collections such as The Amateur Poacher (1879) and Round About a Great Estate (1880), that has drawn most admirers. Walter Besant wrote of his reaction on first reading Jefferies: "Why, we must have been blind all our lives; here were the most wonderful things possible going on under our very noses, but we saw them not."

== Life and works ==
Coate farm in 1896. The roof was originally thatched.

=== Early life ===
John Richard Jefferies (he used the first name only during his childhood) was born at Coate in the parish of Chiseldon, near Swindon, Wiltshire, the son of a farmer, James Luckett Jefferies (1816–1896). His birthplace and home is now a museum open to the public. James Jefferies had the farm from his father, John Jefferies, who had been a printer in London before returning to Swindon to run the family mill and bakery. Richard's mother, Elizabeth Gyde (1817–1895), always called Betsy, was the daughter of John Jefferies's binder and manager.

These relationships are mirrored in the characters of Jefferies's late novel Amaryllis at the Fair (1887); and the portraits of the family in the novel tally with external accounts of the Jefferies. James Jefferies, like Iden in Amaryllis, was devoted to his garden, while struggling to make a financial success of the farm. The garden, lovingly recalled in Wood Magic and Amaryllis, also made a strong impression on the memories of those who knew the Jefferies at the time. Betsy, like Iden's wife, seems to have been dissatisfied with life on the farm: "a town-bred woman with a beautiful face and a pleasure-loving soul, kind and generous to a fault, but unsuited to a country life." The farm was very small, with 39 acres (160,000 m^{2}) of pasture; and a mortgage of £1500 would later begin a slide into debt for James Jefferies, who lost the farm in 1877 and became a jobbing gardener. But these difficulties were less evident in Richard's childhood. The situation was much as in After London (1885), where the farming and gardening Baron is again based on James Jefferies: "The whole place was thus falling to decay, while at the same time it seemed to be flowing with milk and honey". One part of the Jefferies family is strikingly missing from the books. In Wood Magic, Bevis and Amaryllis, the hero (or heroine) has no siblings; only After London gives the main character brothers and depicts the imperfect sympathy between them. James and Elizabeth's first child, Ellen, had died young; but Richard had two younger brothers and a younger sister.

Jefferies spent several of his earlier years, between the ages of four and nine, with his aunt and uncle, the Harrilds, in Sydenham, where he attended a private school, returning to Coate in the holidays. His uncle, Thomas Harrild, was a son of the printing innovator Robert Harrild. Jefferies kept a close friendship with Mrs. Ellen Harrild (nee Gyde) and his letters to her are an important source for biographers. At Coate, he spent most of his time in the countryside; and much of what he narrates of Bevis is true of himself. His father had taken him shooting when he was eight; and already at nine he had shot a rabbit. He was soon spending much of his time shooting, snaring rabbits, and fishing. He also, like Bevis, added home-made rigging to a boat to sail on the reservoir; and he is said to have built his own canoe, like the hero of After London. At the same time, he became a keen reader: favourite books included Homer's Odyssey, Percy's Reliques, Don Quixote and James Fenimore Cooper's The Pathfinder, which served as a model for mock battles fought on a field between the farm and the reservoir.

In November 1864, at the age of sixteen, he and a cousin, James Cox, ran off to France, intending to walk to Russia. (Cox, slightly older than Jefferies, worked for the Great Western Railway and had a little money saved.) After crossing the channel, they soon found that their schoolboy French was insufficient and returned to England. Before they reached Swindon, they noticed an advertisement for cheap crossings from Liverpool to America and set off in this new direction. The tickets however, did not include the cost of food; and the boys were forced to return to Swindon after an attempt to pawn their watches had drawn the attention of the police.

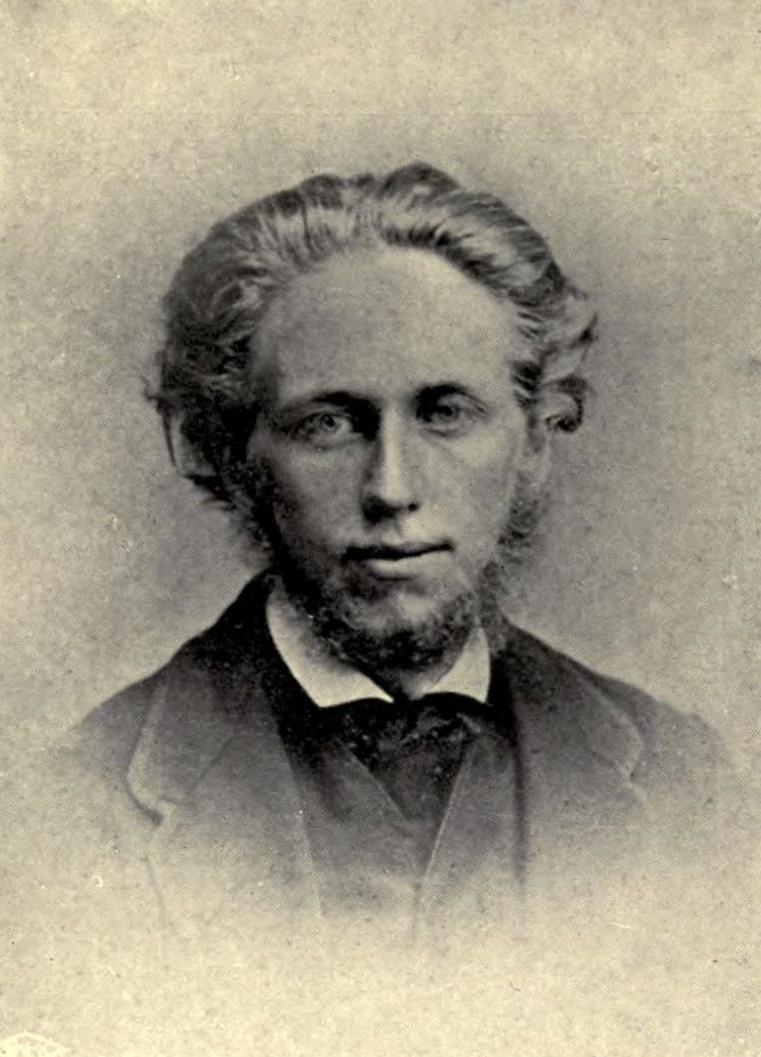
Jefferies in 1872

Jefferies left school at fifteen and at first continued his habits of solitary wanderings about the local countryside. He dressed carelessly and allowed his hair to grow down to his collar. This, with his "bent form and long, rapid stride made him an object of wonder in the town of Swindon. But he was perfectly unconscious of this, or indifferent to it." He helped little on the farm (his only enthusiasm was for chopping and splitting wood) and was regarded as something of an idler. The gun that he always carried drew the suspicion of local landowners – one said, "That young Jefferies is not the sort of fellow you want hanging about in your covers". Finally, early in 1866, he started work as a newspaper reporter for the North Wiltshire Herald. For several years he worked as a reporter, contributing not only to the North Wiltshire Herald, but also to the Wilts and Gloucestershire Standard and to the Swindon Advertiser. The editor of the Swindon Advertiser, William Morris, an antiquarian and local historian, lent Jefferies books and encouraged his early writing attempts. Jefferies himself developed an antiquarian interest in the countryside: he published articles on local history in the North Wiltshire Herald and was the first to notice a stone circle near Coate Farm. He was also spending much time on the downs, particularly at the iron age hill fort, Liddington Castle, where he would lie on the grass, ecstatically feeling and seeking a connection with the natural world. In September 1867 and July 1868 he was very ill. In retrospect the illnesses were clearly the first symptoms of the tuberculosis that would kill him. He emerged from them weakened and very thin – "My legs are as thin as a grasshopper's", he wrote to his aunt. Illness also prompted some reconsideration of his own character: he was going to be "not swell but stylish" in future, since people set so much store by appearance.

He was now actively pursuing a career as a writer, writing a history of the Goddards, a local family, and Reporting, Editing, and Authorship: Practical Hints for Beginners in Literature (1873), in which he shared the fruits of his brief experience as a local reporter. Meanwhile the novels he was writing could not find a publisher. What national attention he attracted was instead from a series of letters to The Times on the Wiltshire agricultural labourer, published in November 1872. The letters, like his other writings from this period, reflect the Conservative outlook of his upbringing.

In 1874, the year of his first published novel, The Scarlet Shawl, he married Jessie Baden (1853–1926), the daughter of a nearby farmer. After living for a few months at Coate Farm, the couple moved to a house in Swindon in 1875 (its current address is 93 Victoria Road); and their first child, Richard Harold Jefferies, was born there on 3 May.

=== First successes ===
==== Essays ====
While in Swindon, Jefferies found it difficult to seek publication or employment with London publishers; and early in 1877, with Jessie and their baby son Harold, he moved to a house at what is now 296 Ewell Road, Tolworth, near Surbiton. (There is a wooden plaque commemorating this by the entrance to Surbiton Library.) The area was then at the limits of London's growth. Jefferies spent much time wandering through the nearby countryside; and these walks would later provide the material for Nature Near London (1883).

Anemone leaf from Round About a Great Estate, described in chap. 5. Smith, Elder & Co. used the emblem in subsequent editions of Jefferies's books.

The Surbiton years were momentous. The couple's next child, a daughter called Jessie after her mother (but known by her second name, Phyllis), was born (on 6 December 1880), and Jefferies began to make his name at last. His new surroundings defined him, both to himself and others, as a country writer. Articles drawing on Jefferies's Wiltshire experiences found a ready market in The Pall Mall Gazette. First came a series of essays based on his friendship with the keeper of the Burderop estate, near Coate, The Gamekeeper at Home, collected as a book in 1878. The book was well received and Jefferies was compared with the great English nature writer, Gilbert White. Three more collections followed the same pattern of publication in The Pall Mall Gazette and then in book form: Wild Life in a Southern County and The Amateur Poacher (both 1879), and Round About a Great Estate (1880). Another collection, Hodge and his Masters (1880), brought together articles first published in the Standard. In the few years that Jefferies took to write these essays, his literary skill developed rapidly: The Amateur Poacher in particular is regarded as a major advance on the earlier works, the first in which he approaches the autobiographical subject matter that is behind his best works. A minor novel, Greene Ferne Farm (1880), was the first to gain recognition, both from contemporaries and in later scholarship.

==== The Bevis books ====
Two books of these years form a sequence. Wood Magic: A Fable (1881) introduces his child-hero, Bevis, a small child on a farm near a small lake, called the "Longpond", clearly Coate Farm and Coate Reservoir. Bevis's exploration of the garden and neighbouring fields brings him into contact with the country's birds and animals, who can speak to him, as can even inanimate parts of nature, such as the stream and the wind. Part of the book is a depiction of a small child's interaction with the natural world, but much is a cynical animal fable of a revolt against the magpie Kapchack, the local tyrant. In Bevis (1882), the boy is older, and the fantasy element, by which animals can talk, is quite absent. Rather, we have realistically related adventures of Bevis and his friend Mark, fighting a mock battle with other local children, rigging a boat and sailing to an island on the lake (which they call "The New Sea"), fishing and even shooting with a homemade gun.

=== Illness and death ===
==== Onset ====
In December 1881, Jefferies began to suffer from his until then undiagnosed tuberculosis, with an anal fistula. After a series of painful operations, he moved to West Brighton to convalesce. About this time he wrote his extraordinary autobiography, The Story of My Heart (1883). He had been planning this work for seventeen years and, in his words, it was "absolutely and unflinchingly true". It was not an autobiography of the events of his life, but an outpouring of his deepest thoughts and feelings. The Story of My Heart caused controversy on its publication, due to the book's rejection of Christianity.

Articles about the Surbiton area were reprinted in the popular Nature Near London (1883), although the last chapters of the book refer to Beachy Head, Ditchling Beacon and other Sussex landmarks.

In Brighton, his third child, Richard Oliver Launcelot Jefferies, was born on 18 July 1883. But his life was to be a short one. Jefferies moved to Eltham, then in Kent, now a part of Greenwich, in June 1884, and here, early in 1885, the child died suddenly of meningitis. Jefferies was so affected that he could not attend the funeral.

==== After London ====
Jefferies's next novel, After London (1885), can be seen as an early example of "post-apocalyptic fiction": after some sudden and unspecified catastrophe has depopulated England, the countryside reverts to nature, and the few survivors to a quasi-medieval way of life.

The book has two parts. The first, "The Relapse into Barbarism", is the account by some later historian of the fall of civilisation and its consequences, with a loving description of nature reclaiming England: fields becoming overrun by forest, domesticated animals running wild, roads and towns becoming overgrown, the hated London reverting to lake and poisonous swampland. The second part, "Wild England", is largely a straightforward adventure set many years later in the wild landscape and society (here too Jefferies was setting an example for the genre); but the opening section, despite some improbabilities, has been much admired for its rigour and compelling narrative.

Critics dissatisfied with the second part often make an exception of chapters 22–24, which go beyond recreation of a medieval world to give a disturbing and surreal description of the site of the fallen city.

Jefferies's interest in catastrophes predates After London: two short unpublished pieces from the 1870s describe social collapse after London is paralysed by freak winter conditions. In the better achieved of these, the narrator is a future historian piecing the story together from surviving accounts. The fantasy of the second part also has a predecessor in a short work, The Rise of Maximin, Emperor of the Occident, serialised in The New Monthly Magazine in 1876, in this case an adventure set in a remote and imaginary past.

Although the society that Jefferies depicts after the fall of London is an unpleasant one, with oppressive petty tyrants at war with each other, and insecurity and injustice for the poor, it still served as an inspiration for William Morris's utopian News from Nowhere (1890). In a letter of 1885, he writes of his reaction to After London: "absurd hopes curled around my heart as I read it." After London also influenced M.P. Shiel's post-apocalyptic novel, The Purple Cloud.

==== Final years ====
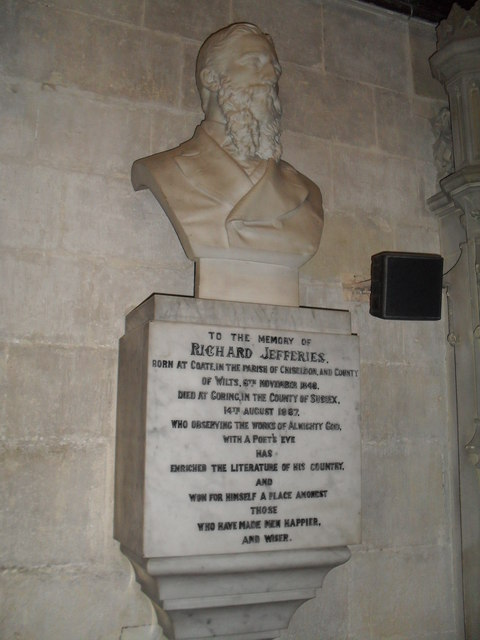
Monument to Richard Jefferies in Salisbury Cathedral

After Eltham, Jefferies lived briefly in various parts of Sussex, first at Rotherfield, then in a house on Crowborough Hill. There Jefferies completed his most ambitious and most unusual novel, Amaryllis at the Fair (1887). Closely based on his own family at Coate, it describes a farm and a family imperceptibly approaching disaster. There is little narrative development; instead significant or typical moments are presented in short scenes or even tableaux.

Illness and resulting lower productivity had impoverished Jefferies; and the editor Charles Longman suggested an application to the Royal Literary Fund. At first Jefferies resisted the suggestion, regarding aid from aristocratic patrons not involved in literary work as humiliating: "Patrons of literature! was there ever such a disgrace in the nineteenth century? Patrons of literature! The thing is simply abominable!" Longman finally succeeded in convincing Jefferies that the fund was "assisted by everybody who had made any success in literature". An application was accepted and the committee voted a grant of one hundred pounds. Another fund arranged by Longman enabled Jefferies to move nearer to the sea, at Goring, a suburb of Worthing. There, on 14 August 1887, he died of tuberculosis and exhaustion. He is buried in Broadwater and Worthing Cemetery in Worthing.

After his death a number of posthumous collections were made of his writings previously published in newspapers and magazines, beginning with Field and Hedgerow (1889), edited by his widow. New collections have appeared since then, but even now not all his writings have been gathered and reprinted.

== Influence and reputation ==
=== Biographies ===
A Peculiarly English Genius or, A Wiltshire Taoist: A Biography of Richard Jefferies by Andrew Rossabi in four volumes published by Petton Books between 2017-2026.

Early works included three by Henry Stephens Salt:

- Richard Jefferies: A Study (1894)
- Richard Jefferies: His Life and His Ideas (1905)
- The Faith of Richard Jefferies (1906)

Henry Williamson edited a collection:

- Richard Jefferies : Selections of his Work with details of his Life and Circumstances, his Death and Immortality (1947)

=== Inspiration to others ===
J. S. Fletcher wrote several novels about English rural life modelled on Jefferies' work, beginning with The Wonderful Wapentake (1894). Henry Williamson's novel series The Flax of Dream (1921–1928) was influenced by Jefferies both in style and themes. Other writers who admired Jefferies included David Garnett, Edward Thomas (who wrote his biography), Leslie Paul, Ethel Mannin, John Fowles, Henry Miller, Raymond Williams, Jeff VanderMeer and Ludovic Kennedy.

Jefferies' novel After London was a source of inspiration for the band Bird in the Belly's 2022 concept album After the City. The band adapted extracts from the novel, together with broadside ballads, plague poetry and Lancashire Cotton Famine poetry to create a back story to the events that Jefferies details in his novel.

Jefferies' ideas became an inspiration for the conservationist Rachel Carson.

=== Commemorations ===
The Richard Jefferies Bird Sanctuary in Surbiton commemorates him.

The BBC TV series Antiques Road Trip featured the Richard Jefferies Museum in 2022 when antiques expert James Braxton met with the museum's director Mike Pringle to tell the authors story.

The Richard Jefferies Society awards an annual Richard Jefferies Award for nature writing.

== Works ==
The following list is necessarily selective. Much of Jefferies's writing was not published in book form in his lifetime. Many works surviving in manuscript or only published in journals have been published piecemeal by various editors since his death. Since his contributions to journals were generally anonymous, identification is often a problem. For a fuller survey, see Miller and Matthews (1993).

=== Published in Jefferies's lifetime ===
- The Scarlet Shawl (London: Tinsley Brothers, 1874)
- Restless Human Hearts (London: Tinsley Brothers, 1875)
- World's End (London: Tinsley Brothers, 1877)
- The Gamekeeper at Home (London: Smith, Elder & Co., 1878) (reissued by Cambridge University Press, 2009; ISBN 978-1-108-00410-7)
- Wild Life in a Southern County (London: Smith, Elder & Co., 1879)
- The Amateur Poacher (London: Smith, Elder & Co., 1879) (reissued by Cambridge University Press, 2009; ISBN 978-1-108-00409-1)
- Greene Ferne Farm (London: Smith, Elder & Co., 1880)
- Hodge and His Masters (London: Smith, Elder & Co., 1880)
- Round About a Great Estate (London: Smith, Elder & Co., 1880)
- Wood Magic (London: Cassell, Petter, Galpin & Co., 1881)
- Bevis: the Story of a Boy (London: Sampson Low, Marston, Searle, & Rivington, 1882)
- Nature Near London (London: Chatto & Windus, 1883)
- The Story of My Heart: An Autobiography (London: Longmans, Green, & Co., 1883)
- Red Deer (London: Longmans, Green, & Co., 1884)
- The Life of the Fields (London: Chatto & Windus, 1884)
- The Dewy Morn (London: Richard Bentley and Son, 1884)
- After London; Or, Wild England (London: Cassell & Company, Ltd., 1885)
- The Open Air (London: Chatto & Windus, 1885)
- Amaryllis at the Fair (London: Sampson Low, Marston, Searle, & Rivington, 1887)

=== Posthumous publications ===
Only the first of these books (produced by his widow) was planned by Jefferies.

- Field and Hedgerow; Being the Last Essays of Richard Jefferies (London: Longmans, Green, & Co., 1889)
- The Toilers in the Field (London: Longmans, Green, & Co., 1892)
- The Early Fiction of Richard Jefferies, ed. G. Toplis (London: Simpkin, Marshall, Hamilton, Kent & Co Ltd., 1896), somewhat bowdlerised
- Jefferies' Land: A History of Swindon and its Environs, ed. G. Toplis (London: Simpkin, Marshall, Hamilton, Kent & Co Ltd., 1896)
- The Hills and the Vale, collected and introduced by E. Thomas (London: Duckworth & Co, 1909)
- Eye of the Beholder: an illustrated anthology (Southampton: Ashford Press Pub., 1987)
- "The Rise of Maximin: Emperor of the Orient", first published in serial form in 'The New Monthly Magazine' (1876–7), (Oxfordshire: Petton Books, 2012). ISBN 978-0-9563751-3-1.
- "The Farmer's World: Richard Jefferies' Agricultural Journalism in the late 1870s". A collection of Jefferies's articles published in the Livestock Journal. Published by Petton Books, 2016, ISBN 978-0-9563751-6-2
- "Ben Tubbs Adventures" (Norfolk: Petton Books, 2016). Jefferies's earliest work of fiction.

== Sources ==
- Arkell, Reginald, Richard Jefferies and His Countryside, Herbert Jenkins, 1946.
- Banerjee, Jacqueline, Literary Surrey, John Owen Smith (2005). ISBN 1-873855-50-8 ISBN 978-1873855508 pp. 55–56, 64–72.
- Walter Besant, The Eulogy of Richard Jefferies (London: Chatto and Windus, 1888, fourth impression 1905).
- Malcolm Elwin (ed.), The Essential Richard Jefferies (London: Jonathan Cape, 1948).
- John Fowles, "Introduction", in R. Jefferies, After London (Oxford: OUP, 1980), vii–xxi. ISBN 0-19-281266-1
- W. J. Keith, Richard Jefferies, A Critical Study (London: University of Toronto Press, 1965).
- Q. D. Leavis, Lives and works of Richard Jefferies, Scrutiny 6 (1938) 435–46, reprinted in Collected Essays Vol. 3 (Cambridge: Cambridge University Press, 1989), 254–64. ISBN 0-521-26703-X
- S. J. Looker and C. Porteous, Richard Jefferies, Man of the Fields (London: John Baker, 1965).
- H. Matthews and P. Treitel, The Forward Life of Richard Jefferies (Oxford: Petton Books, 1994). ISBN 978-0-9522813-0-6
- H. Matthews and P. Treitel, Richard Jefferies: An Index (Longcot: Petton Books, 2008). ISBN 978-0-9522813-2-0
- H. Matthews and R. Welshman, "Richard Jefferies: An Anthology" (Longcot: Petton Books, 2010). ISBN 978-0-9563751-2-4
- G. Miller and H. Matthews, Richard Jefferies, A bibliographical study (Aldershot: Scolar Press, 1993). ISBN 0-85967-918-7
- B. Morris, Richard Jefferies and the Ecological Vision (Oxford: Trafford Publishing, 2006). ISBN 1-4120-9828-9
- Mike Pringle, Wild Life, A Unique Vision of Our World (with a foreword by Monty Don, Victorian contextual information by Liz Howell and an afterword by Graeme Maxton), Swindon: Richard Jefferies Museum Trust, 2021). ISBN 978-1-8381300-0-8
- A. Rossabi, (John) Richard Jefferies (1848–1887), Oxford Dictionary of National Biography (Oxford: OUP, 2004).
- A. Rossabi, A Peculiarly English Genius, or a Wiltshire Taoist: A Biography of Richard Jefferies, The Early Years, 1848–1867 (Foulsham, Norfolk UK: Petton Books, 2017). ISBN 978-0-9563751-8-6
- A. Rossabi, A Peculiarly English Genius, or a Wiltshire Taoist: A Biography of Richard Jefferies, The Years of Struggle, 1867–1876 (Foulsham, Norfolk UK: Petton Books, 2020). ISBN 978-0-9563751-9-3
- A. Rossabi, Richard Jefferies: a Miscellany (Cambridge: Galileo Books, 2019). ISBN 978-1-912916-05-4
- A. Smith, The Interpreter: a biography of Richard Jefferies (Swindon: Blue Gate Books, 2008). ISBN 978-0-9555874-3-6.
- B. Taylor, Richard Jefferies (Boston: Twayne Publishers, 1982) ISBN 0-8057-6816-5
- E. Thomas, Richard Jefferies: His Life and Work (London: Hutchinson, 1909).
- K. Tryon, Adventures in the Vale of the White Horse: Jefferies Land (Longcot: Petton Books, 2010). ISBN 978-0-9563751-1-7
- H. Sheehan, Jill Carter: The Cunning Spider (Swindon: BlueGate Books, 2007).
