= The Story of My Heart =

Book by Richard Jefferies

- Author: Richard Jefferies
- Language: English
- Publication date: 1883

The Story of My Heart is a non-fiction book first published in 1883 by English nature writer, essayist, and journalist Richard Jefferies.

The book has been described as a "spiritual autobiography" where Jefferies discusses natural history and philosophy.

In The Story of My Heart, Jefferies recounted the development of his thoughts since the age of eighteen. Throughout the book, Jefferies repeatedly described his love of the natural world and his longing for harmony with "the visible universe". Jefferies argued that excessive learning is a restriction on thought. Jefferies also argued that there is no "design" in the natural world, that the human soul dies with the body, and that the traditional Christian conceptions of God does not exist. Jefferies writes in The Story of My Heart about his belief that there is a "soul life" flowing through the natural world, a force which he describes as "infinitely higher than deity". Throughout the book, Jefferies expresses strong admiration for both the beauty of the natural world and the human body. Jefferies postulated that human beings should attain the "fullness of physical life" and reject asceticism. In a later passage, Jefferies criticized poverty in Victorian Britain, saying the nation had sufficient resources to feed and clothe everyone:

Food and drink, roof and clothes, are the inalienable right of every child born into the light.

The book and its themes have been compared to the American transcendentalist movement. Other Transcendentalist themes concerning rapturous union with Nature can be found in the writings of Ralph Waldo Emerson, Henry Thoreau, and John Muir. The scholar Roger Ebbatson considers that the book's "speculative" spiritualism is emblematic of the decline of Christian belief in the more empirical Victorian era. Neil Evernden has argued that the philosophy of nature that Jefferies puts forward in the book is similar to modern ecological concepts, with that philosophy's emphasis on the relationship between humans, animals and plants.

== Reception ==
The Oxford Companion to English Literature noted that the atheism expressed in The Story of My Heart caused "considerable scandal" upon publication. Critical reaction to the book was mixed. Jefferies' biographer Henry Stephens Salt wrote "there is no doubt that judged from a literary as well as from an intellectual standpoint, the most noteworthy of Jefferies' complete volumes is The Story of my Heart". Salt also compared the philosophy articulated in the book to those of Percy Bysshe Shelley and Henry David Thoreau. Salt also noted, however, that The Story of My Heart sold poorly compared to the other books published by Jefferies in his lifetime. Edward Carpenter described The Story of My Heart as "most beautiful - wonderfully beautiful." Mary Webb read The Story of My Heart as a teenager and greatly admired the book, calling it a "Gospel of the Earth". Henry Miller praised The Story of My Heart in his book The Books In My Life (1952); Miller wrote that "The Story of My Heart is an inspirational work and in the whole of literature there are very few such works. It is a mighty utterance. An heroic utterance." Leslie Paul lauded The Story of My Heart, writing that in the book Jefferies had made a "tremendous intellectual and spiritual effort" to understand the natural world. However, Paul rejected the book's repudiation of Christianity. Ethel Mannin also praised The Story of My Heart. Mannin called The Story of My Heart "a lovely book", although she said she could not agree with the book's philosophy "in its entirety", she thought parts of it were "beautiful and true". In a letter to Richard Duncan in 1962, Denise Levertov wrote that she had read The Story of My Heart. She added "the first 2 chapters have lived with me always, since I read them when I was about 15." Conversely, D. H. Lawrence, in a 1912 letter to Edward Garnett, wrote "I don't like The Story of My Heart". Jefferies' fellow nature writer, W. H. Hudson, dismissed The Story of My Heart. Hudson wrote about the book "We've all got mysticism in us; it's nothing to brag about", and later wrote that the book "touches on the borders of insanity." H. J. Massingham, who had expressed admiration for Jefferies' other works, dismissed The Story of My Heart as "a very bad and tawdry book": Massingham was particularly offended by the book's censure of Christianity. A new edition of The Story of My Heart published in 2014 notes that the American conservationist Rachel Carson had two copies of the book at her bedside, but others found the work "barely comprehensible".
