= Scandaroon pigeon =

Breed of pigeon

Scandaroon
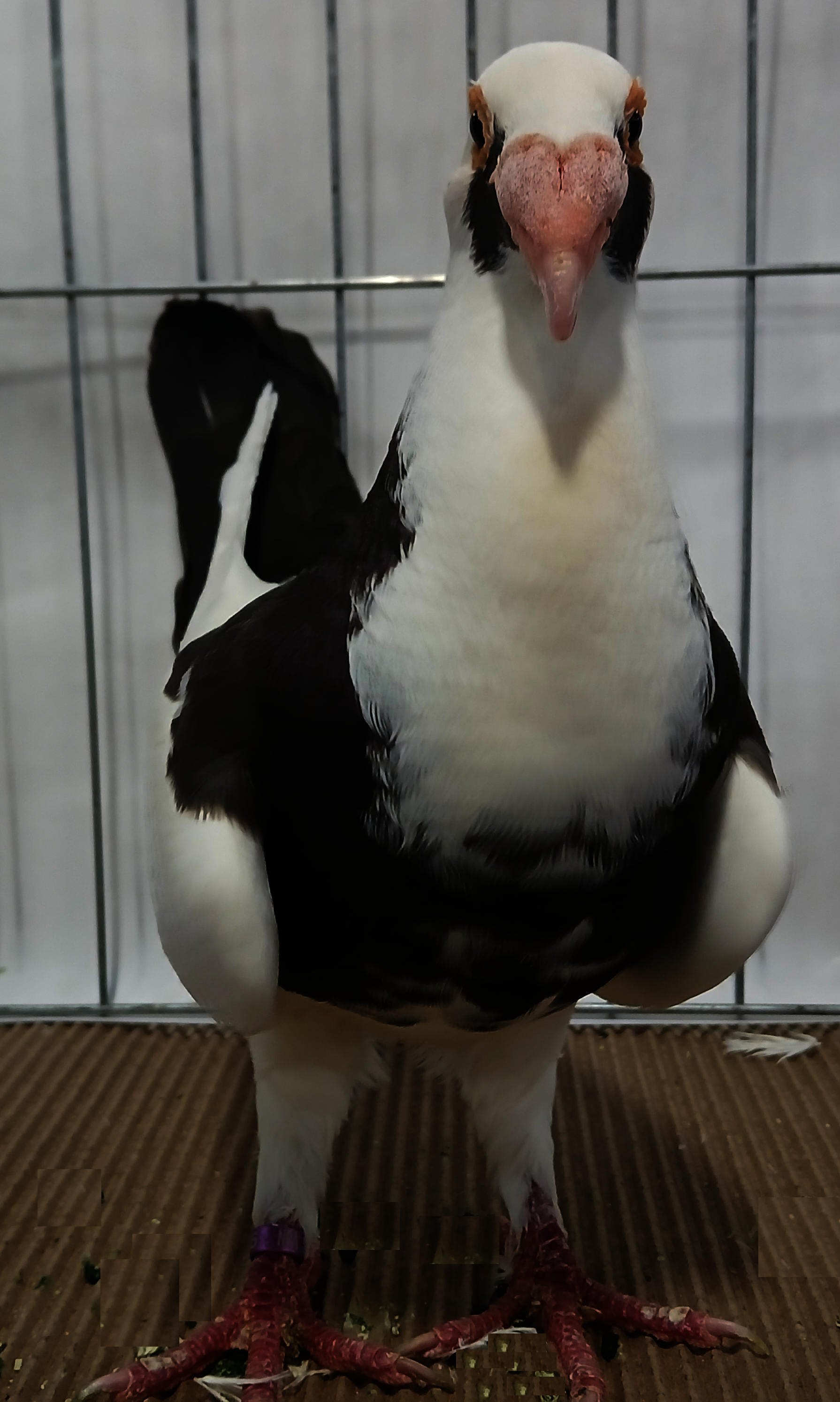
- Looking at you
- Conservation status: uncommon
- Distribution: world wide
- Type: Show

Traits
- Weight: Male: 18; Female: 17
- Feather ornamentation: Intense color
- Color: black\blue, red, yellow, brown, silver
- Lifespan: 12 years
- Body Marking: Colored tail, chest, and cheeks
- eye color: bull

Classification
- Australian: Homers & Hens Group 4
- European: Wattle
- US: Wattle

Notes
- Large curving beak

The Scandaroon is a breed of fancy pigeon developed over many years of selective breeding. Scandaroons, along with other varieties of domesticated pigeons, are all descendants from the rock pigeon (Columba livia). The breed is also known as a Nuremberg Bagdad.

The most distinctive characteristics of this breed are its long beak, which curves downward, and its striking red cere.

== Gallery ==
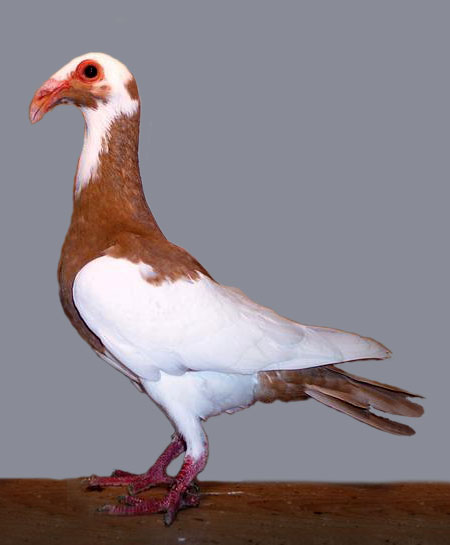

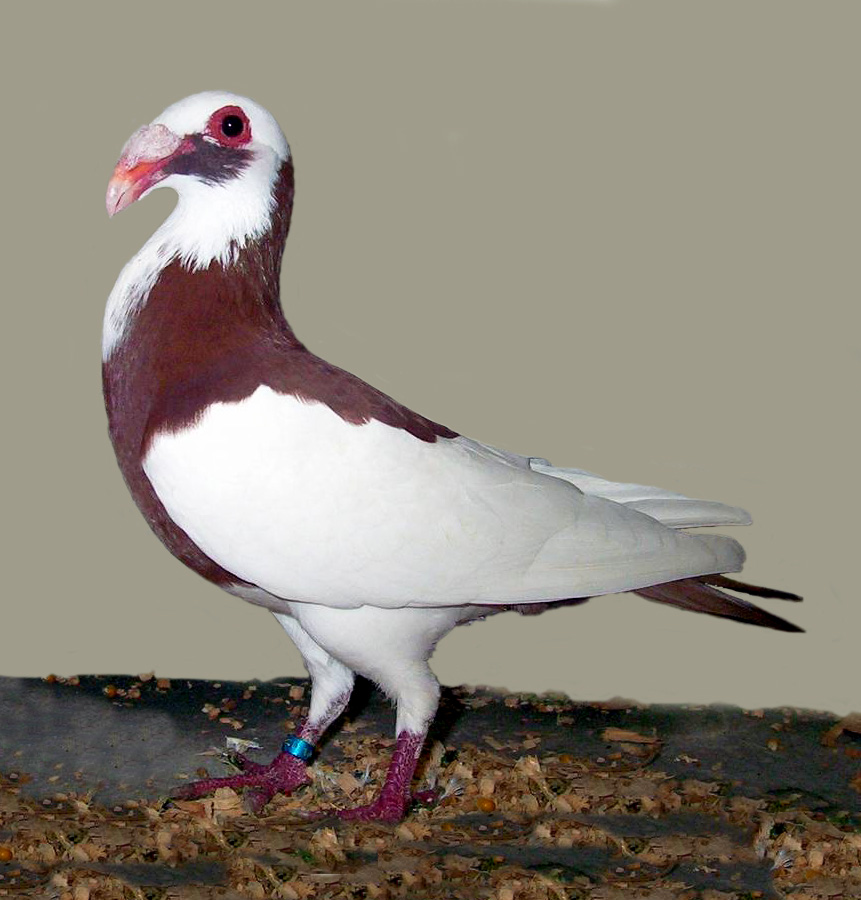

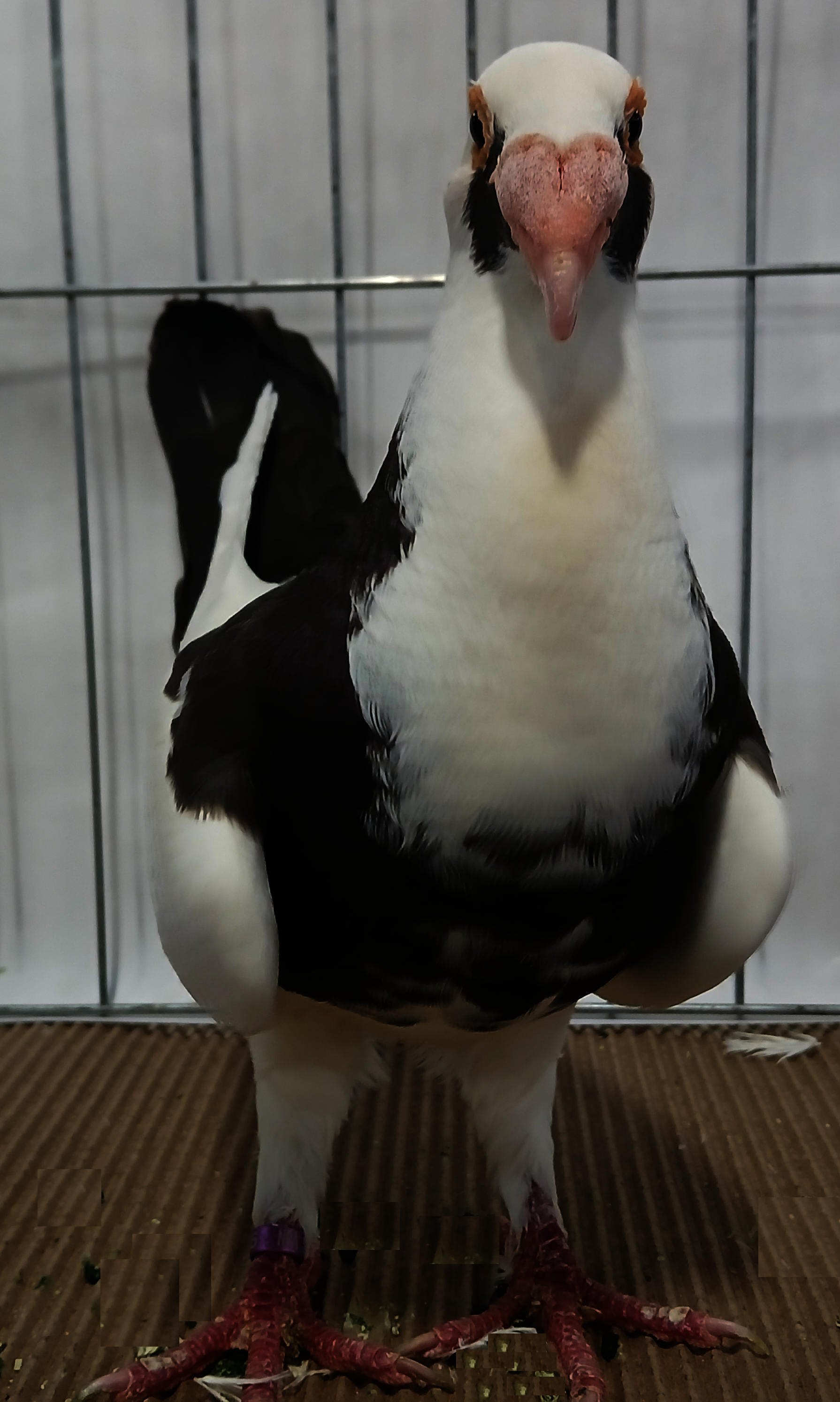

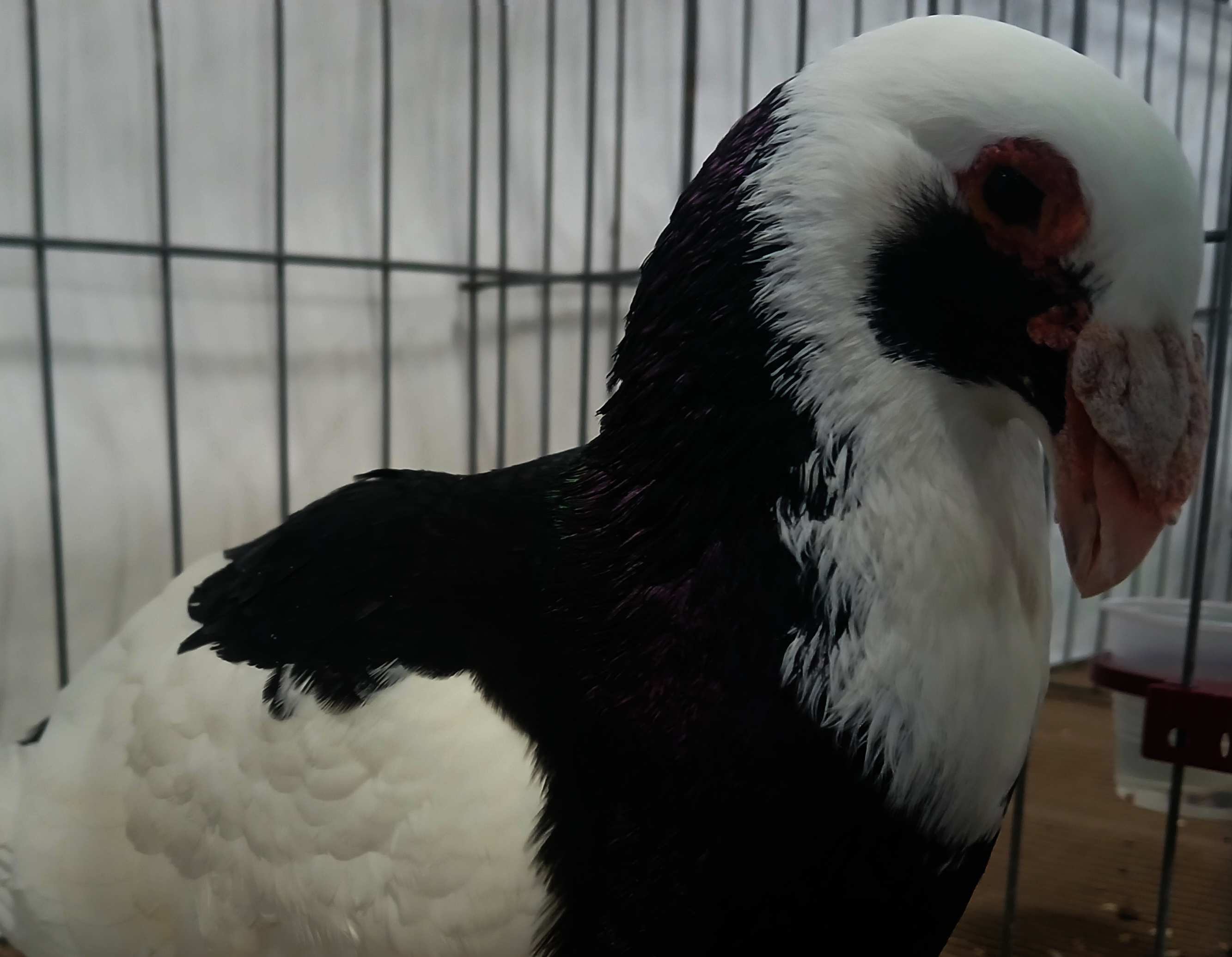

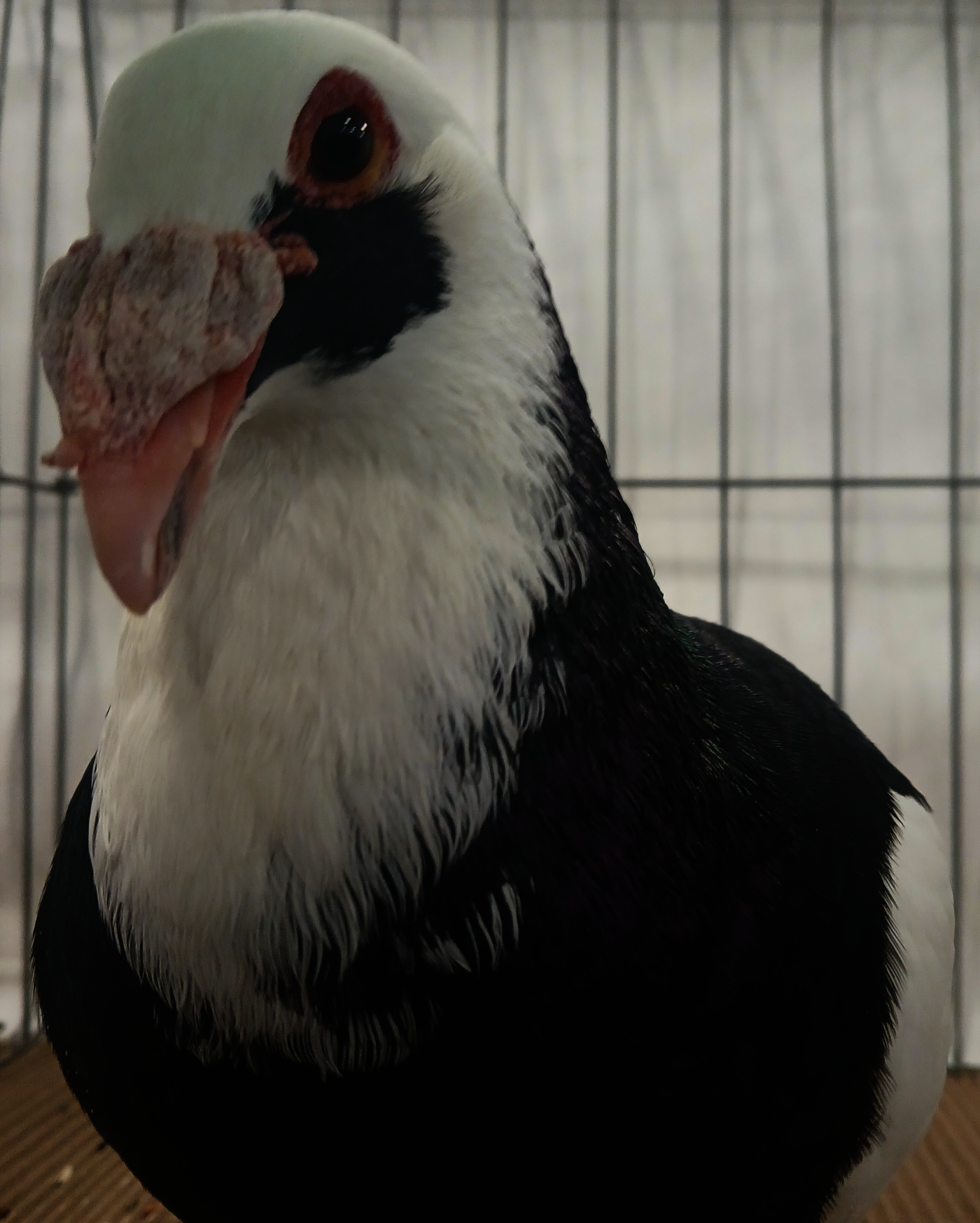

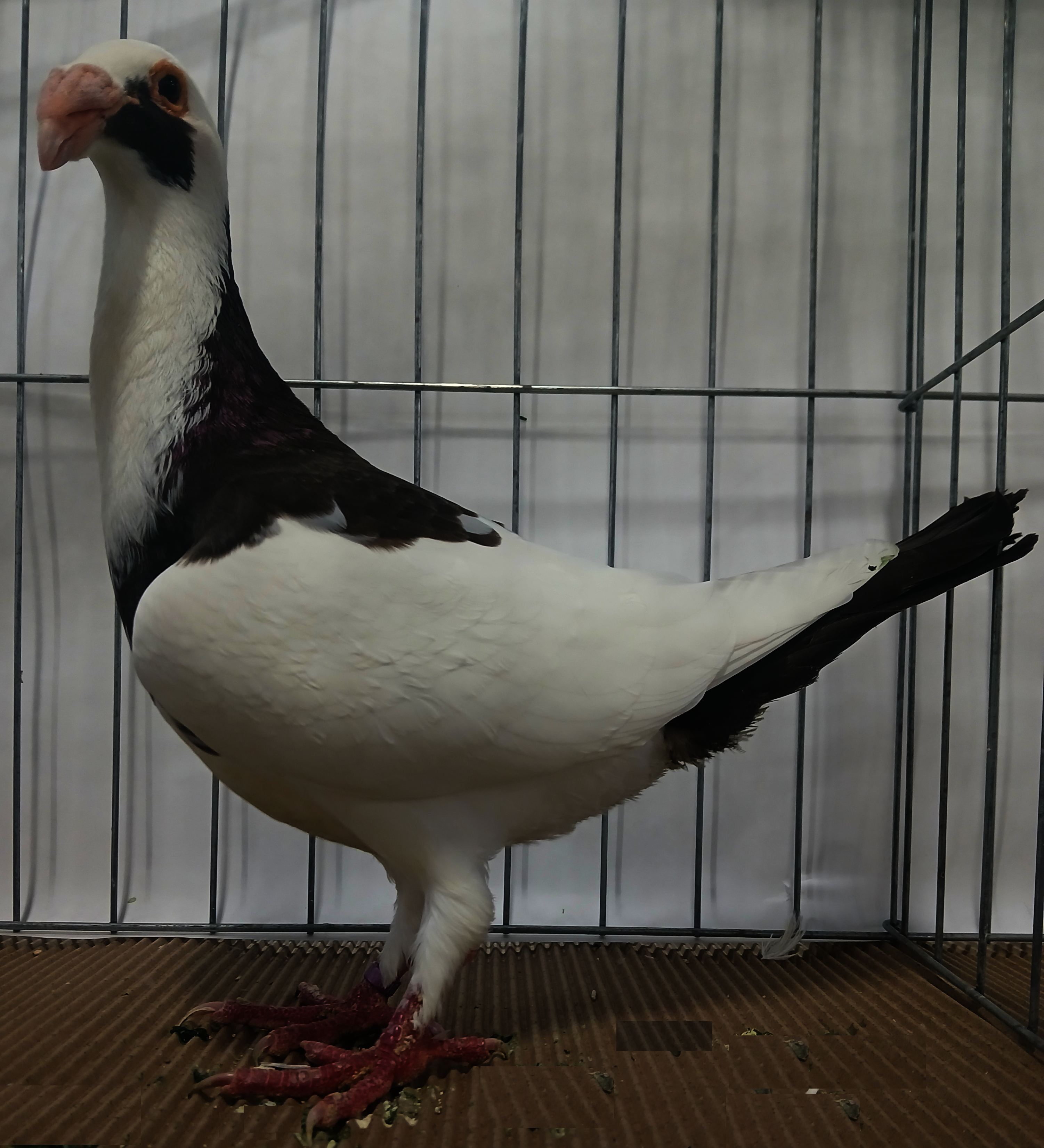

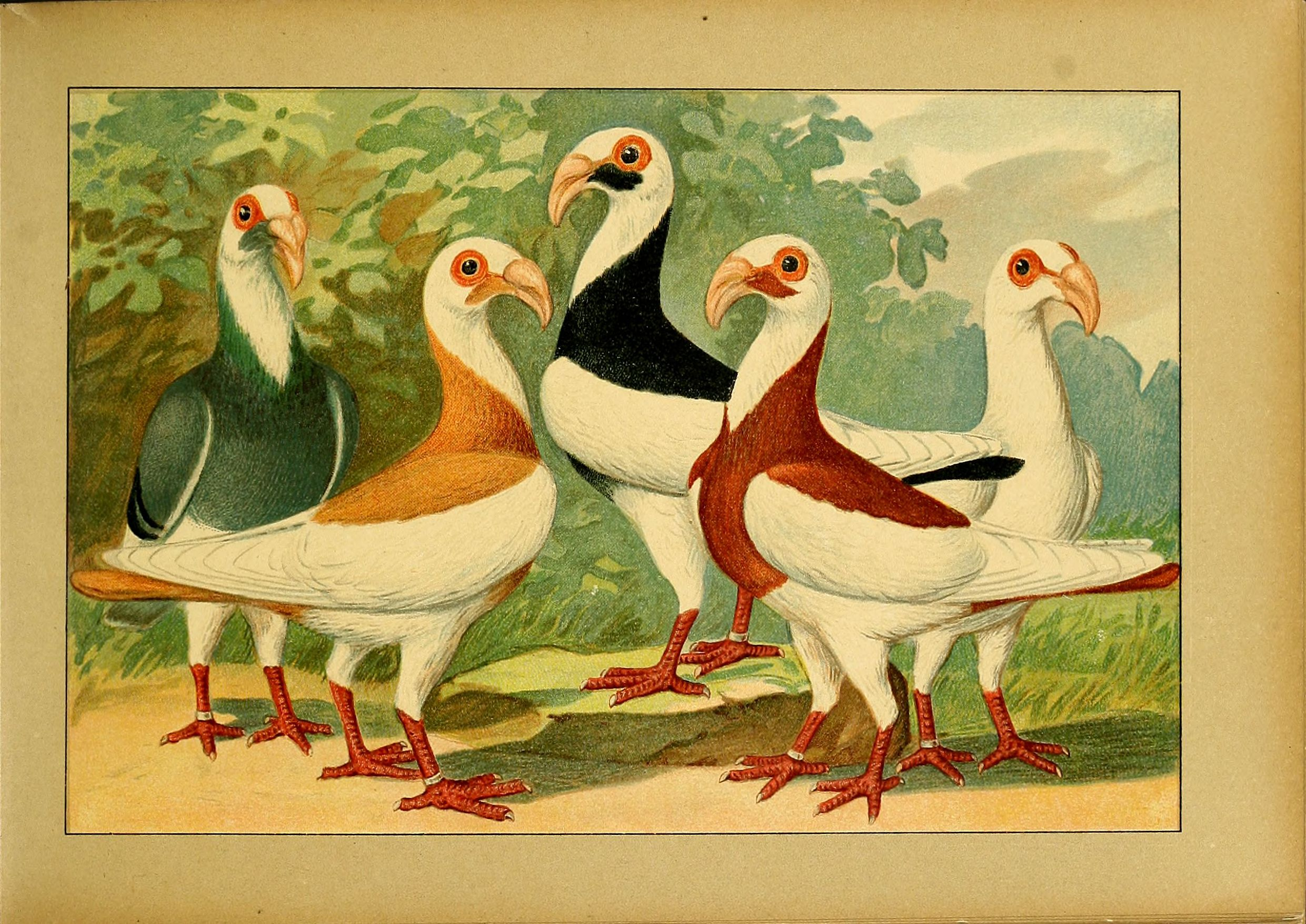
Schachtzabel 1906 Tafel 11

== See also ==
- Pigeon Diet
- Pigeon Housing
- List of pigeon breeds

https://commons.wikimedia.org/wiki/File:American_Pigeon_Journal_1949_08.pdf
