= Albert, Somme =

Commune in Hauts-de-France, France

Albert
- Commune
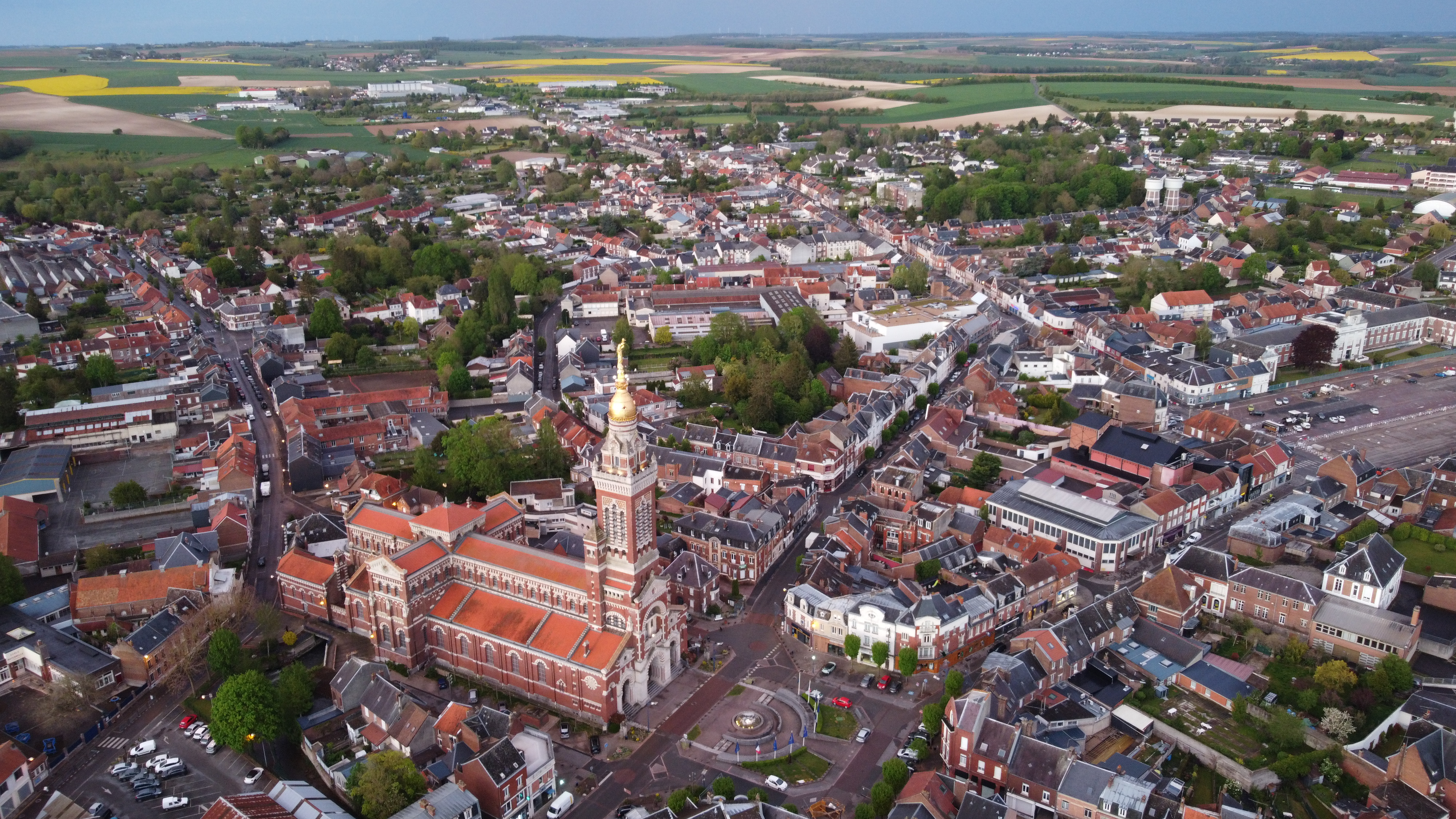
- Basilica of Notre-Dame de Brebières & the city

- Coat of arms
- Location of Albert
- Location within France Location within Hauts-de-France
- Coordinates: 50°00′10″N 2°39′10″E
- Country: France
- Region: Hauts-de-France
- Department: Somme
- Arrondissement: Péronne
- Canton: Albert
- Intercommunality: Pays du Coquelicot

Government
  - Mayor (2023–2026): Maxime Lajeunesse
- Area^{1}: 13.8 km^{2} (5.3 sq mi)
- Elevation: 67 m (220 ft)
- Highest elevation: 121 m (397 ft)
- Lowest elevation: 42 m (138 ft)
- Population (2023): 9,521
  - Density: 690/km^{2} (1,790/sq mi)
- Time zone: UTC+01:00 (CET)
  - Summer (DST): UTC+02:00 (CEST)
- INSEE/Postal code: 80016 /80300
- ^{1} French Land Register data, which excludes lakes, ponds, glaciers > 1 km^{2} (0.386 sq mi or 247 acres) and river estuaries.

Albert (French pronunciation: [albɛʁ]; Picard: Inque) is a commune in the Somme department in Hauts-de-France in northern France.

It is located about halfway between Amiens and Bapaume.

== History ==
Albert was founded as a Roman outpost, in about 54 BC. After being known by various forms of the name of the local river, the Ancre, it was renamed to Albert after it passed to Charles d'Albert, duc de Luynes. It was a key location in the Battle of the Somme in World War I, and World War I tourism is important for the town.

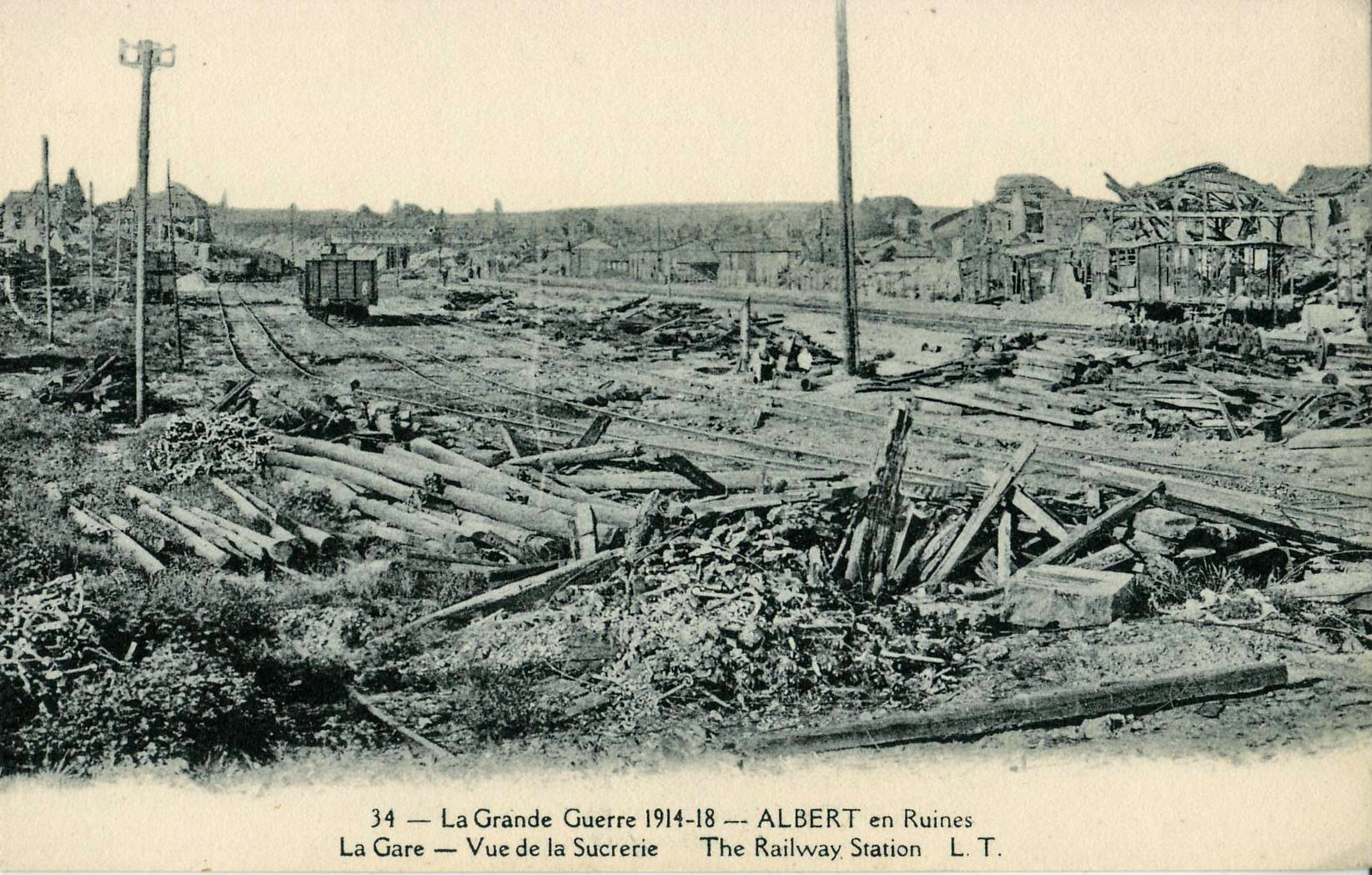
The destruction of Albert during the First World War. Pictured is the railway station.

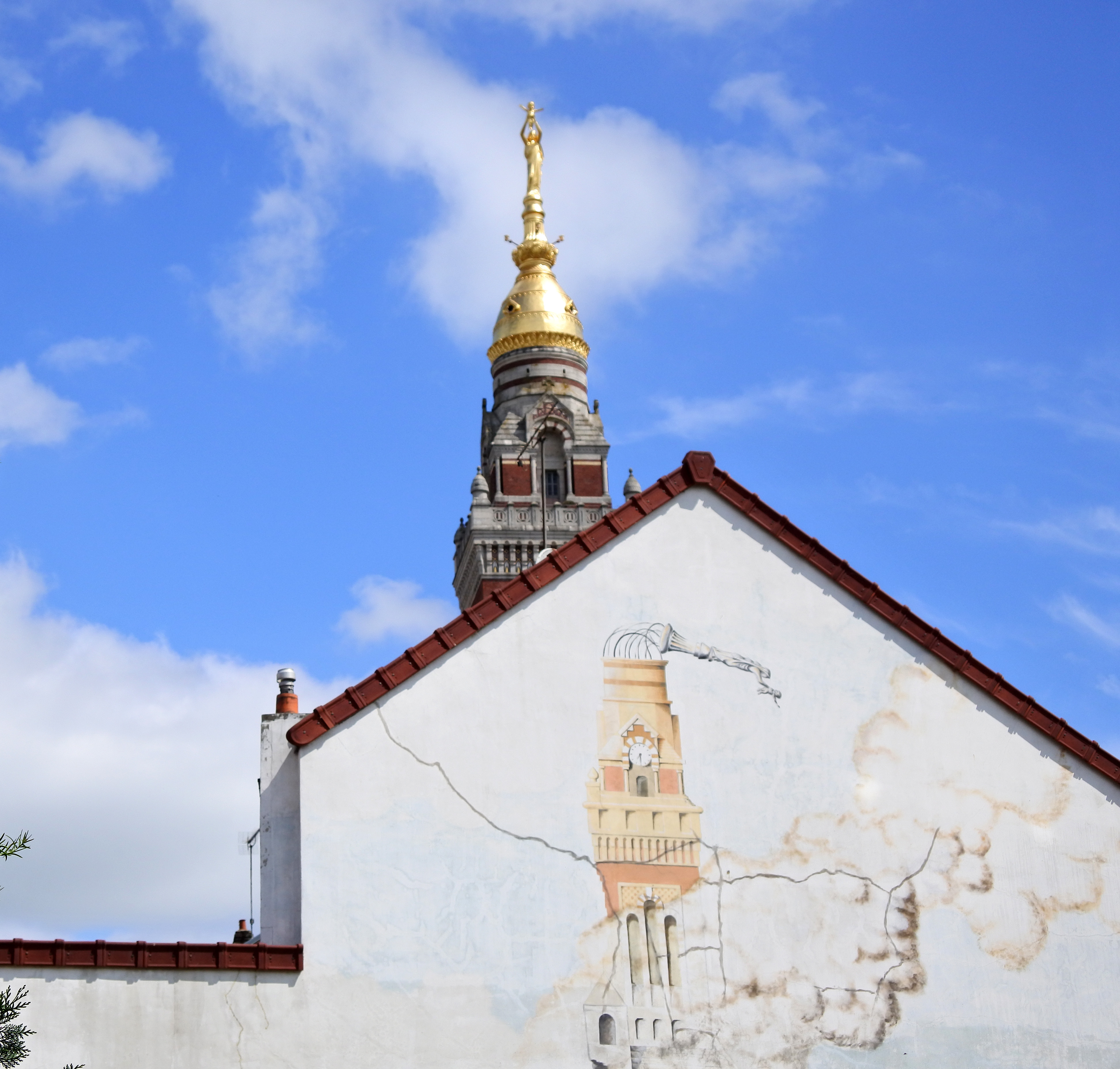
Basilica of Notre-Dame de Brebières tower and statue. The mural depicts the damaged "Golden Virgin" statue as it appeared during the First World War.

During World War I, the statue of Mary and the infant Jesus – designed by sculptor Albert Roze and dubbed the Golden Virgin – on top of the Basilica of Our Lady of Brebières was hit by a shell on 15 January 1915 and slumped to a near-horizontal position, where however it remained until further shelling in 1918 destroyed the tower.

In his letters home to his wife, Rupert Inglis, who was a former rugby international and now a forces chaplain, described passing through Albert: "We went through the place today (2 October 1915) where the Virgin Statue at the top of the Church was hit by a shell in January. The statue was knocked over, but has never fallen, I sent you a picture of it. It really is a wonderful sight. It is incomprehensible how it can have stayed there, but I think it is now lower than when the photograph was taken, and no doubt will come down with the next gale. The Church and village are wrecked, there's a huge hole made by a Jack Johnson just outside the west door of the Church."

The German army recaptured the town in March 1918 during the Spring Offensive; the British, to prevent the Germans from using the church tower as a machine gun post, bombarded and destroyed the basilica. The statue fell in April 1918 and was never recovered.

Albert was completely reconstructed after the war, including widening and re-orienting the town's main streets. The Basilica, however, was faithfully rebuilt according to its original design by Eduoard Duthoit, the son of the architect who had overseen its construction in 1885–1895. The present statue is an exact replica of Roze's original design, and a war memorial designed by Roze and featuring an image of the Leaning Virgin can be seen in the Abri (Shelter) Museum, which houses souvenirs of the war. The underground shelters in which the museum is located served as protective bunkers for Albert's residents during aerial bombardments in World War II.

The city appears in the short story "The Garden of Forking Paths", by the Argentine writer Jorge Luis Borges. In the story it is the location of a British artillery park that the Germans are about to bomb during World War I.

The Beaumont-Hamel Newfoundland Memorial is located only 9 kilometres from the village. It is a memorial site dedicated to Dominion of Newfoundland forces members who were killed during World War I. Officially opened by British field marshal Earl Haig in 1925, the memorial is one of only two National Historic Sites of Canada located outside of Canada.

== Liberation of Albert in World War II ==
On September 1, 1944, the 7th Battalion of the Green Howards were spearheading the Allied advance through northern France. After passing through Beauvais, Boves and Villers Bretonneux, the battalion arrived at Morlancourt at 2.30pm. Here they were intercepted by the Maquis who informed them of a strong enemy force in nearby Albert.

At 8pm, A and B Companies remained in reserve at Morlancourt, while C and D Companies advanced towards Albert. On arrival, near Becourt, the Carrier Platoon commander, Captain Murray divided his command, placing two sections on the Albert-Peronne road, while taking the other two sections with him to the Albert-Becourt track.

Soon after 10pm, loud explosions were heard in Albert and an hour later, enemy transport was heard approaching Becourt along the track. A German armoured car and a small scout car led a convoy of lorries that the British allowed to pass. The final lorry was closely followed by a tank and a half-track armoured vehicle, at which point the British opened fire. The tank stopped and returned fire while the half-track advanced to within ten metres of the British who threw grenades at it forcing it to withdraw. While reversing, the half-track was hit by a P.I.A.T. anti-tank grenade. It lost control and exploded. The Green Howards lost one carrier which was set on fire by the tank.

The men then took up a position flanking the track where they opened up with Bren guns on the convoy. As the Germans were travelling, in many cases, astride their vehicles, the heavy fusillade created a catastrophic number of casualties amongst the enemy.

When the firing stopped, Capt. Murray, accompanied by a sergeant and a corporal, advanced further down the track on foot when they encountered a seven man German patrol at point blank range. The three British soldiers promptly opened fire causing the Germans to flee into the nearby wood which was then bombarded with P.I.A.T. and mortars.

On reconnoitering the wood the following morning, the British found between thirty and forty German vehicles, packed head to tail, all burnt out. There were many signs of a panicky retreat.

Meanwhile, the other two sections, under Sergeant Rawson on the Albert-Peronne Road, when they realised their road was not being used, came across to assist their comrades on the Becourt track. On approaching the wood, they were heavily fired on, and, when making a detour, ran into a German armoured vehicle. When two Germans approached them on foot, they killed one and wounded the other, an officer who was taken to Battalion Headquarters

At 6am the following morning, the Battalion moved into Albert. There was no opposition and they moved freely through the town which came out to welcome the liberators. In the words of the Green Howard war diary that day, the Battalion had "quite a celebration."

There is little doubt that Captain Murray's decision to engage the enemy overnight, rather than wait until daylight, averted a potential disaster for the people of Albert.

During the operation, which lasted for four hours and routed a far superior and better equipped enemy, the Green Howards lost two men, Sergeant Harland Matthews (27) and private Richard Westcott (19).

For his courage, leadership and a very high standard of personal gallantry, Captain Murray was awarded the Military Cross. The full citation reads, "During the whole of these operations, which lasted for more than four hours, Captain Murray displayed great powers of leadership and a very high standard of personal gallantry. He was a great inspiration to his men, who, during the night, inflicted many casualties on the enemy, and much destruction to his vehicles. The enemy were undoubtedly in considerable strength and in possession of a number of heavy weapons."

== Twin towns ==
Albert is twinned with the British town of Ulverston in Cumbria.

The two towns regularly meet to play football at Easter with the Cyril Barker Shield being contested every year. Albert and Ulverston alternate the match's venue.

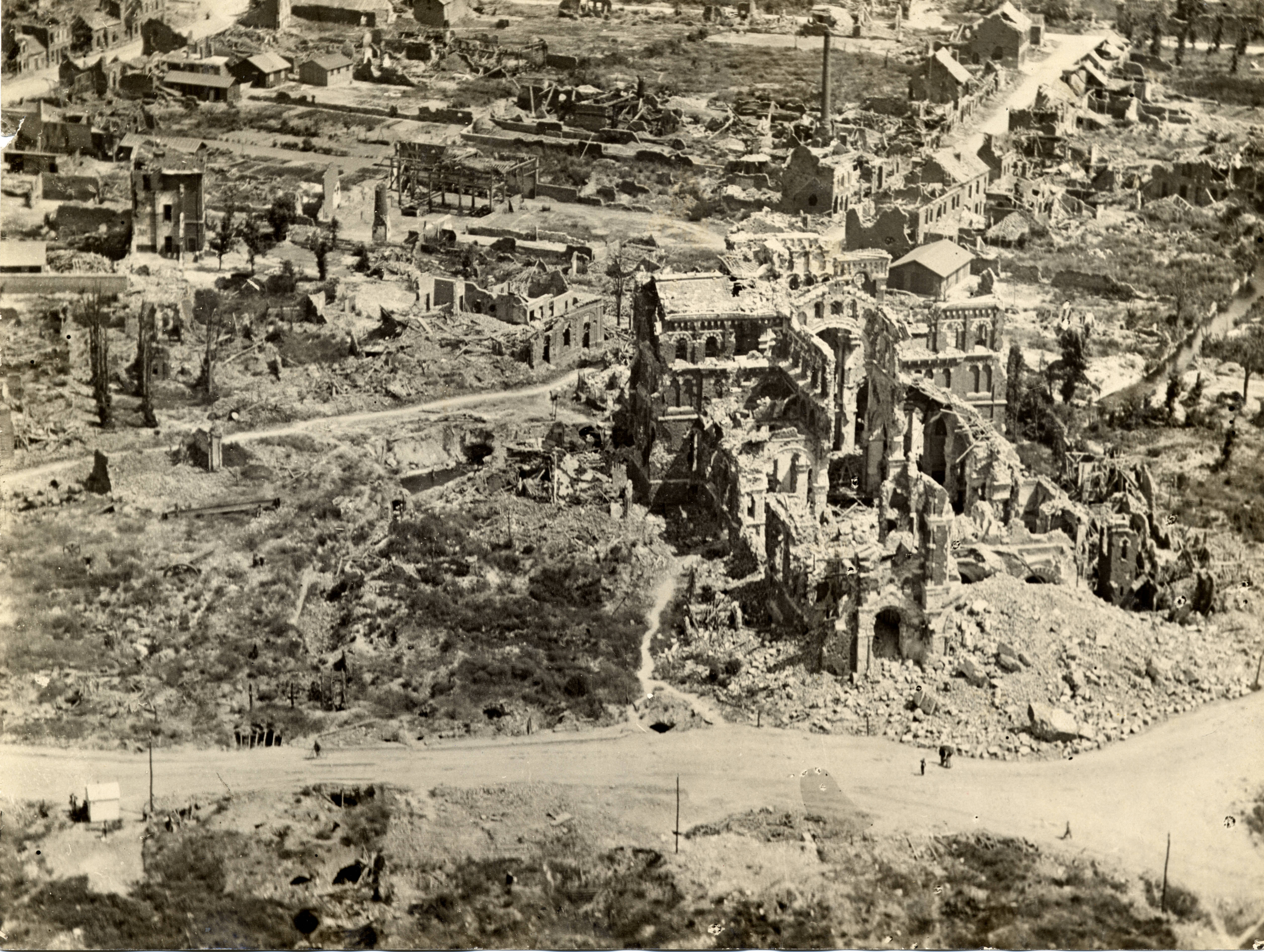
Basilique Notre-Dame de Brebières and Albert in 1918 taken by Brigadier General William Okell Holden Dodds commanding officer of the 5th Canadian Division Artillery

Albert is also twinned with the German towns of Aldenhoven and Niesky. After the First World War, Albert was "adopted" by the English city of Birmingham, whose citizens funded a new almshouse building, and the main street is named Rue de Birmingham.

== Population ==
Historical population
Year	Pop.	±% p.a.
1968	10,960	—
1975	11,784	+1.04%
1982	10,894	−1.12%
1990	10,010	−1.05%
1999	10,065	+0.06%
2007	10,027	−0.05%
2012	9,899	−0.26%
2017	9,928	+0.06%
2023	9,521	−0.70%
Source: INSEE

== Notable residents ==
The French operatic bass Xavier Depraz was born in Albert on 22 April 1926.

== See also ==
- Battle of Albert (disambiguation)
- Communes of the Somme department
- List of France's twin towns
- Vendémiaire Pavot
