= The Golden Virgin =

Sculpture located in Albert, France

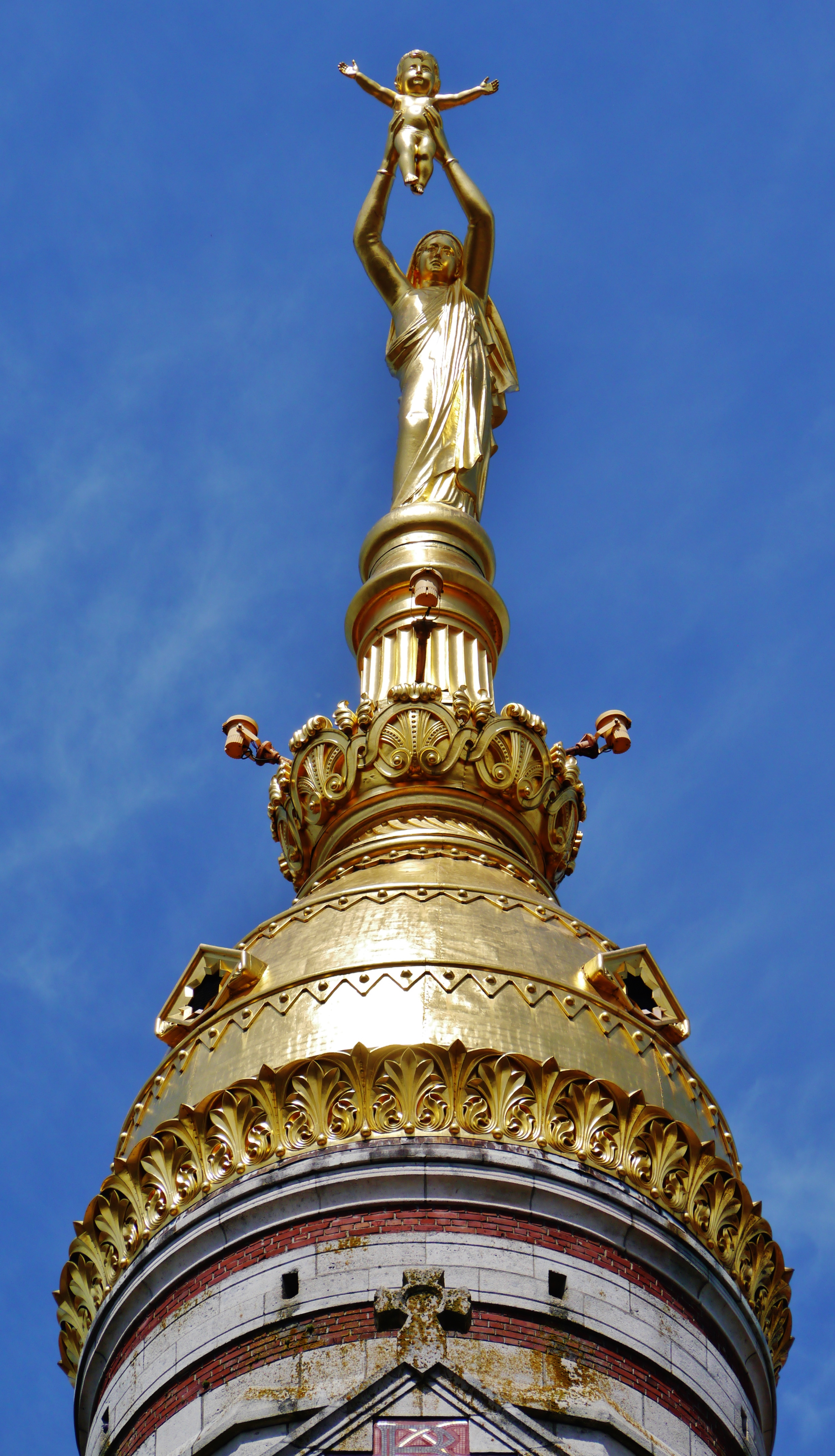
- The Golden Virgin atop the basilica
- Interactive map of The Golden Virgin
- Location: 20 Rue Anicet Godin, 80300 Albert, France
- Coordinates: 50°00′13.5″N 02°38′53.1″E
- Designer: Albert Roze
- Material: Metal
- Height: 5 m (16 ft 5 in)
- Completion date: 1897
- Restored date: 1929 (recast and replaced)
- Dedicated to: Virgin Mary

The Golden Virgin, also known as The Leaning Virgin, is a gilded sculpture by the French artist Albert Roze originally completed in 1897 and installed on the rooftop of the Basilica of Our Lady of Brebières (French: Basilique Notre-Dame de Brebières) in Albert, France. Regarded as a symbol of French resilience during World War I, (Note: Most soldiers in the British Army who were referred to as Tommies, called the sculpture the 'Leaning Virgin' or the 'Golden Virgin'. When the Australian troops arrived in July of 1916 the statue had already been hit by shelling and was slumped over; they named it Fanny Durack, an Australian female Olympic swimmer who had won a gold medal in the 1912 Olympics. The Australian trench diggers thought the slumped over figure looked like Fanny diving into a swimming pool.) the artwork portrays the Virgin Mary presenting Christ Child heavenward.

In 1915, German shelling knocked over the statue, and it nearly toppled again due to shellfire during the 1916 Battle of the Somme. (Note: The Battle of the Somme was fought between the towns of Albert and Arras just north of the Somme river. It began on 1 July 1916 and was stopped on the 18 November 1916. The battle is famous for the heavy losses of British troops: 58,000. One third of the troops were killed on the first day of the battle.) After falling in 1918 as a result of British bombardment, the statue went missing. Its destruction took on mythical proportions, with the anticipated toppling believed to influence the war's outcome. Eventually, the statue was recast and replaced in 1929.

== Background ==
The Golden Virgin was designed by French sculptor Albert Roze in 1897 and it was placed atop the Basilique Notre-Dame de Brebières. The sculpture depicts a golden-colored Virgin Mary holding the infant Christ high above her head. The sculpture was covered with 40,000 sheets of gold leaf. It also was 5 m (16 ft) tall and there were 238 steps leading to the sculpture. More and more pilgrims continued to visit the site and Pope Leo XIII was made aware, and visited the site in 1898. Leo XIII christened the church and seeing The Golden Virgin, he called the basilica the "Lourdes of the North". The sculpture was fastened atop the bell tower. In 1915, it was leaning after 2,000 shells hit the town and basilica. Engineers fastened a chain to prevent it from toppling. (Note: Some credit French engineers. The discrepancy is understandable amid the battle and hindered battlefield observation or recording. It may be attributable to the fog of war.)

== History and analysis ==
=== Early years (1897–1914) ===
The leaning Golden Virgin and the damaged basilica, 1915

The sculpture was installed atop the basilica in 1897. By 1910, it was a landmark atop the basilica. The sculpture was a prominent landmark in the sixth stage of the Circuit de l'Est. Two pilots, Alfred Leblanc and Émile Aubrun, used the sculpture as a compass and it was referred to in a news article as the "famous golden virgin". In August 1910, one of the pilots, Aubrun, flew circles around the sculpture with his Blériot XI aircraft in order to get a closer look. When asked about his laps around the statue he said,

Not having occasion to see such a site every day, I made the best of it and examined the statue from near at hand making several circles round it.

In 1914, World War I had begun and 80 percent of the German Army had mobilized and were positioned on the Western Front. By the end of 1914, German troops held strong defensive positions inside France. In 1914, German forces suspected a French observation post was housed in the church's bell tower so beginning in October 1914, they shelled the dome. In 1915, during the Battle of the Somme, the sculpture was shelled and left leaning at an angle of more than 90 degrees to the vertical axis.

=== World War I and later (1915–1929) ===
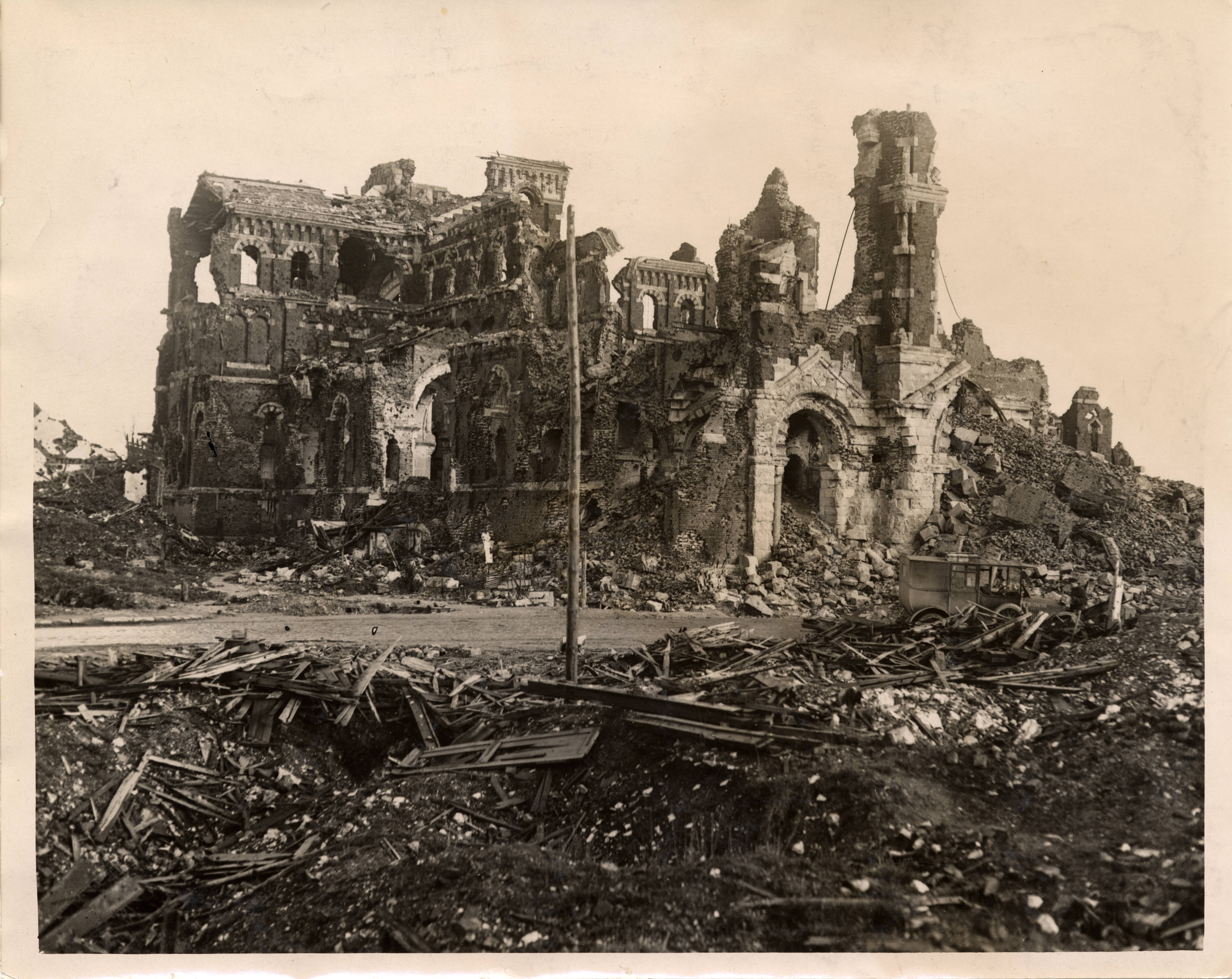
The Basilique Notre-Dame de Brebières nearly destroyed, taken after The Golden Virgin fell and went missing in 1918. Photograph by Canadian brigadier general William Okell Holden Dodds.

By 7 January 1915, the dome was destroyed and by 21 January, the base of the statue was hit and the statue "tilted alarmingly". Although artillery shells destroyed much of the town of Albert, the statue of Mary remained attached to the Basilica but was tilted at an extreme angle.

Many soldiers were superstitious and they studied the sculpture daily; they wrote about it in their diaries and remarked that it was knocked over and threatening to fall at any time. Messages about the statue were passed between troops; it was often said to be a portent; "When the Virgin falls, the war will end". Soldiers also said whoever knocked down the statue would lose the war. (Note: "No one wanted it to remain what it was: a damaged gilded metal statue now barely fixed to the tower and it could fall any moment. Soldiers spread a mythology among themselves related to the statue.")

The statue became a symbol to both British and German troops; soldiers remarked the Virgin Mary was keeping the baby Christ from falling. On 27 March 1918, The Golden Virgin was at the center of fighting. During the night an intense moonlit battlefield allowed the Germans to target British troops and target the sculpture. German troops occupied the city of Albert in 1918 and the British shelled the Basilique in order to deprive the Germans of the elevated position, and the statue was toppled. It was never recovered. By 28 September 1918, the sculpture was reported to have fallen and only partial walls of the Basilica were left standing. German troops had destroyed the building including the basement. German troops also set clockwork bombs which were timed to explode three weeks after they left. Coincidentally, World War I ended 11 November 1918.

According to 23 November 1918 report in The Bellman:

It was the tradition of the French peasants that when the Virgin fell the war would come to an end. It is said that an Australian gunner finally brought it down. At any rate, when the Germans were beaten back at the beginning of the last Allied offensive and Albert was retaken, the tower and statue had fallen in ruins. The peasants believe that the luck of the Germans had deserted them when the Virgin of Albert fell. From that day the power of the enemy waned, and this leaning statue certainly marked the high tide of the German invasion.

Residents discussed placing the sculpture in its famous war-time pose but later decided to place it in its original standing pose. The sculpture of The Golden Virgin was recast in 1929 and fitted atop the 76 m (249 ft 4 in) bell tower during the reconstruction of the Basilica.

== Legacy ==
A photograph of the leaning statue was a intriguing to many; it appeared on many postcards at the time. The work of French engineers that stabilized it is still well regarded today. Over 100 years later, it remains a symbol of the triumph of good over evil. (Note: The Golden Virgin was recast and placed upon the reconstructed basilica.) It is a landmark, a tourist attraction, and an artistic inspiration.

The events surrounding the church and its sculpture are the subject of Henry Williamson's 1957 novel The Golden Virgin; volume 6 of the series A Chronicle of Ancient Sunlight. It was selected as a Daily Mail Book of the Month. On September 8, a novena is celebrated to honor The Leaning Virgin.

== Gallery ==
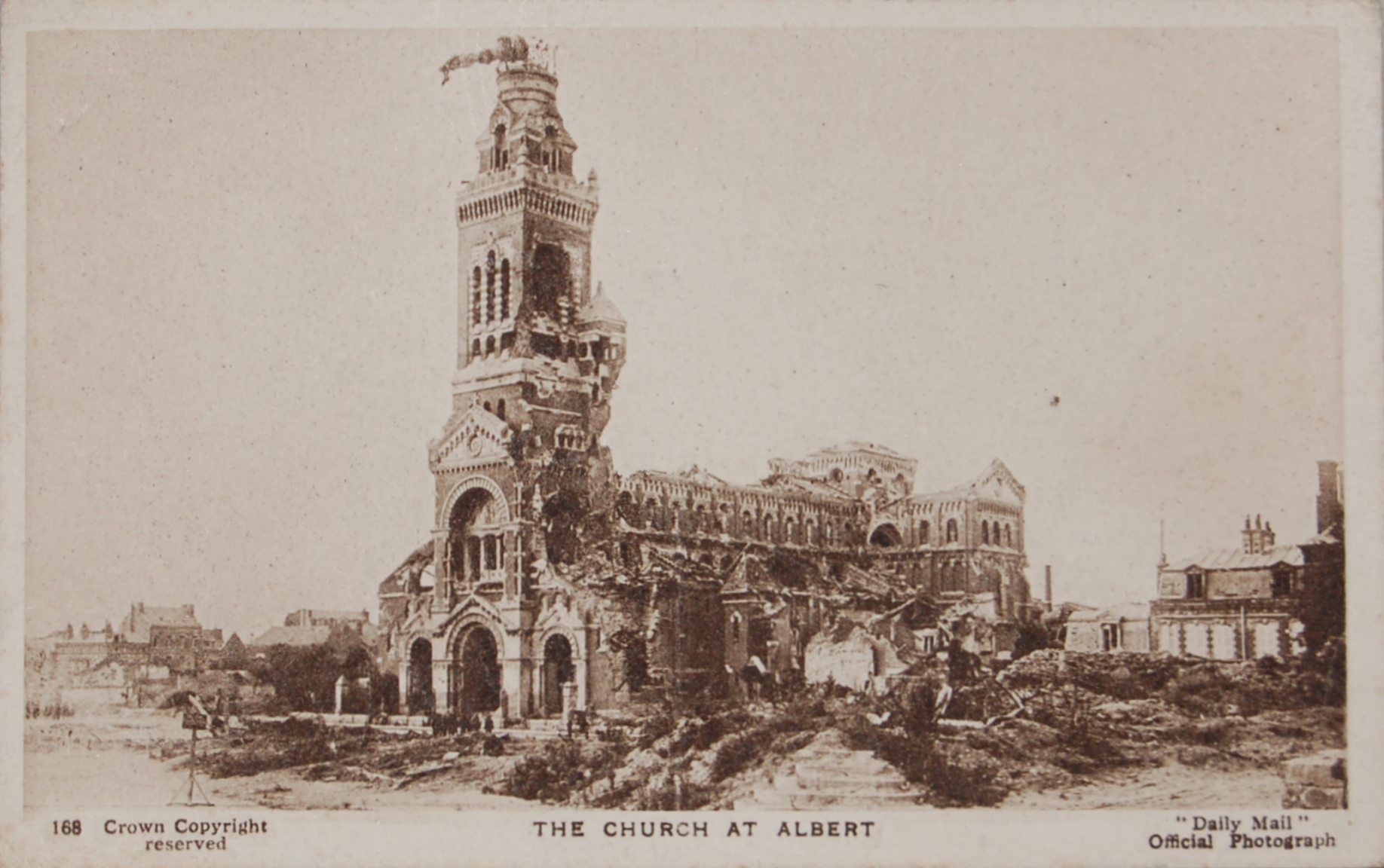
Daily Mail official war photograph, "The Church at Albert", 1914–1917

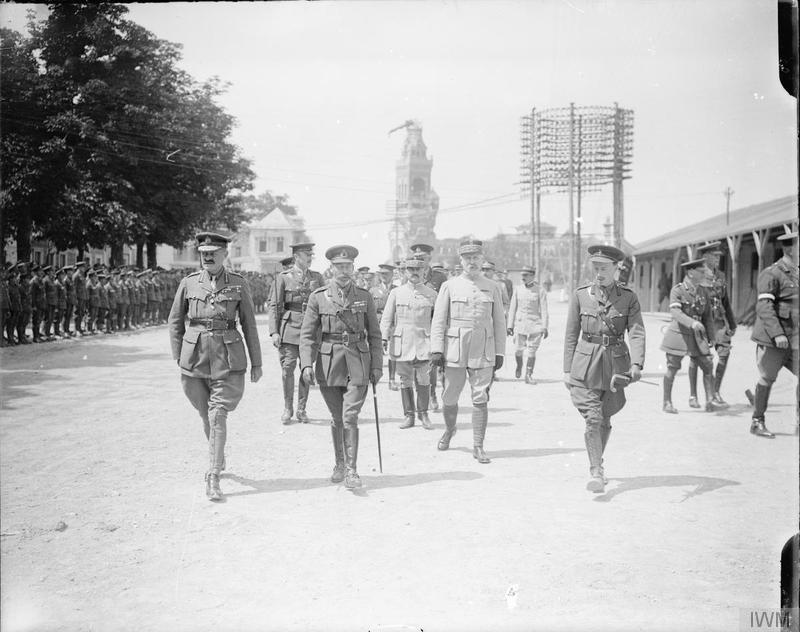
Official visit to the Western Front, with The Leaning Virgin in the background, 1917

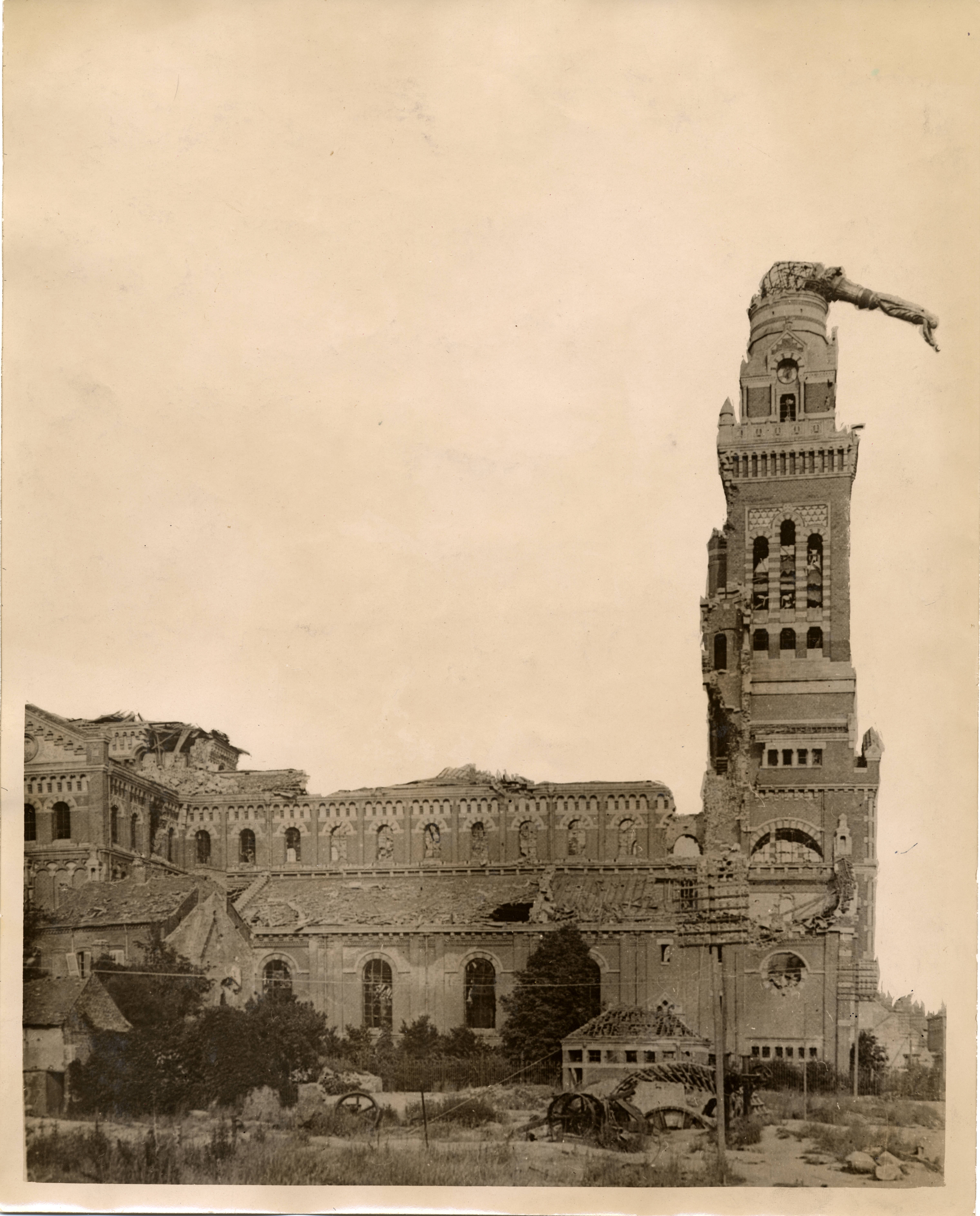
A photograph from an album of World War I–related photographs in the William Okell Holden Dodds fonds, 1917

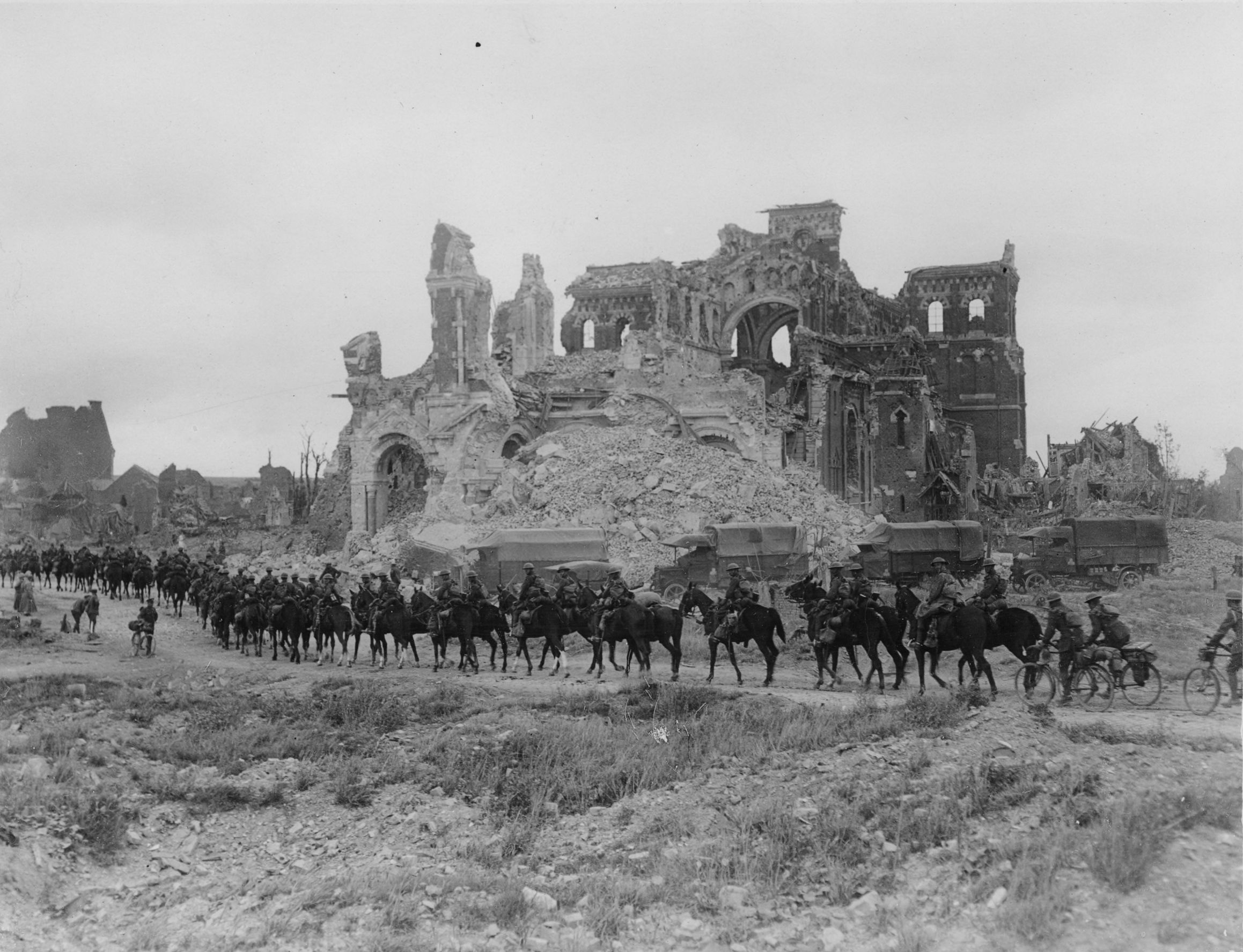
British cavalry passing the ruins of the basilica, August 1918

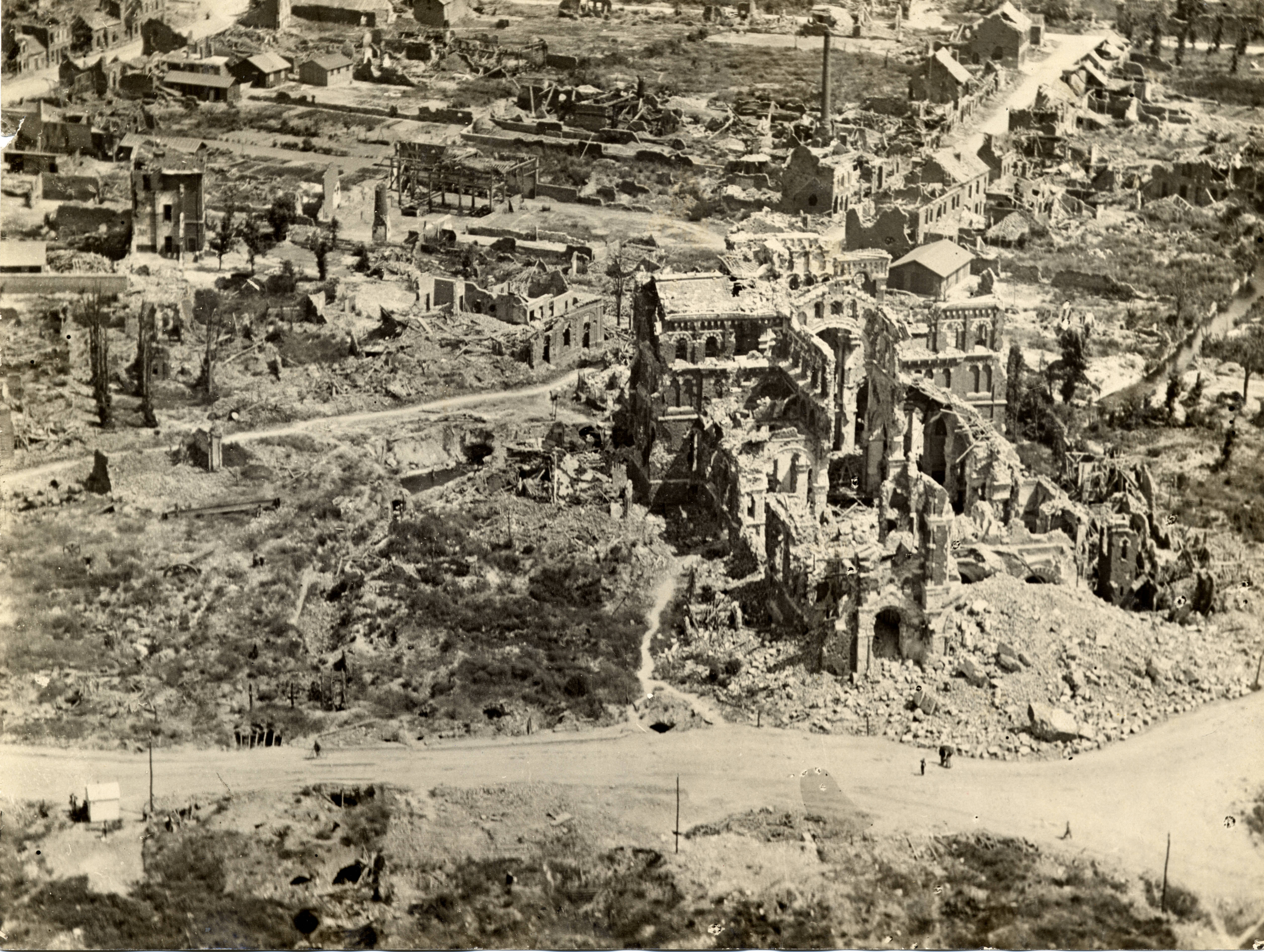
Another photograph from an album of World War I–related photographs in the William Okell Holden Dodds fonds, 1918

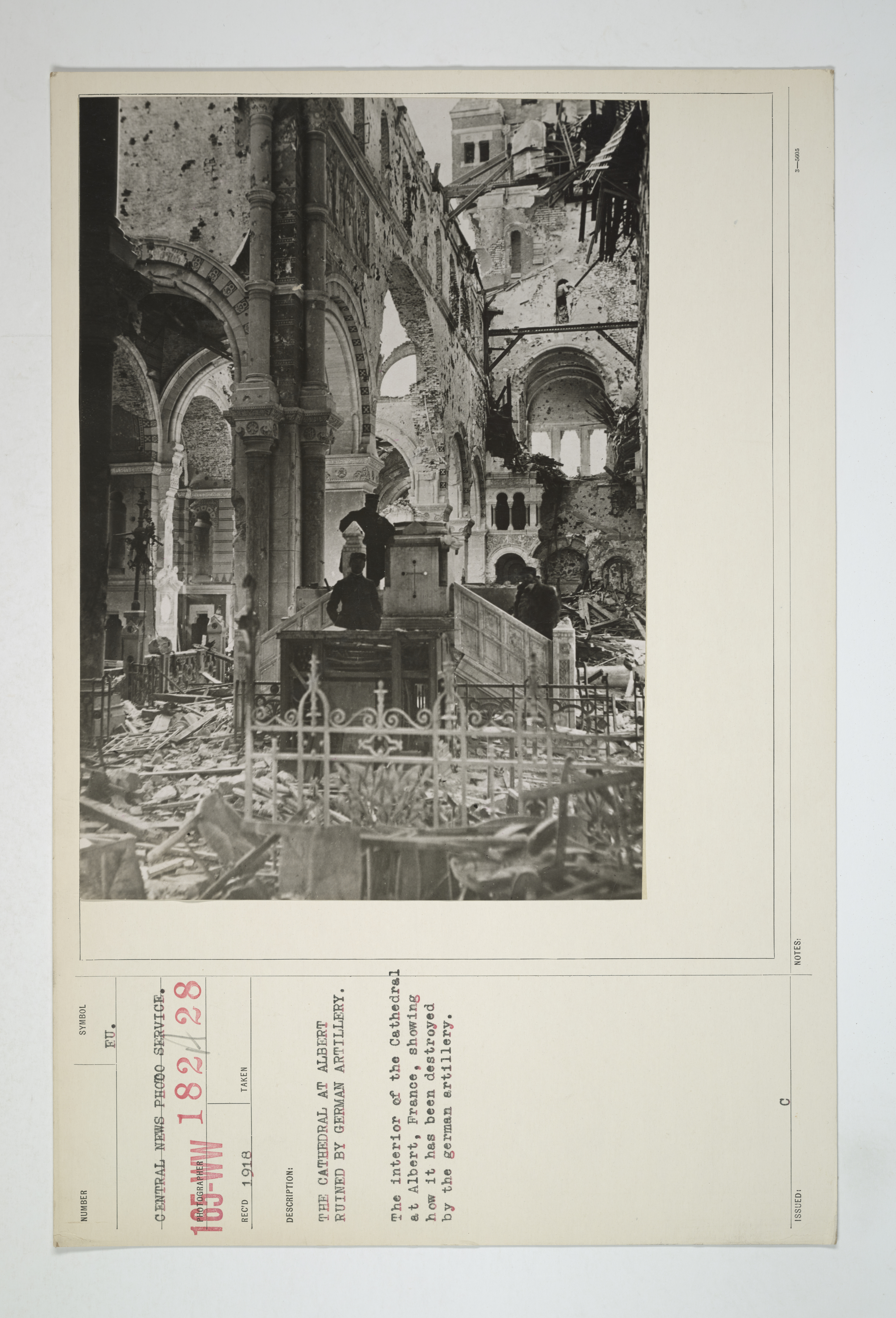
The basilica's interior, showing how it was destroyed by the German artillery, 1914–1917

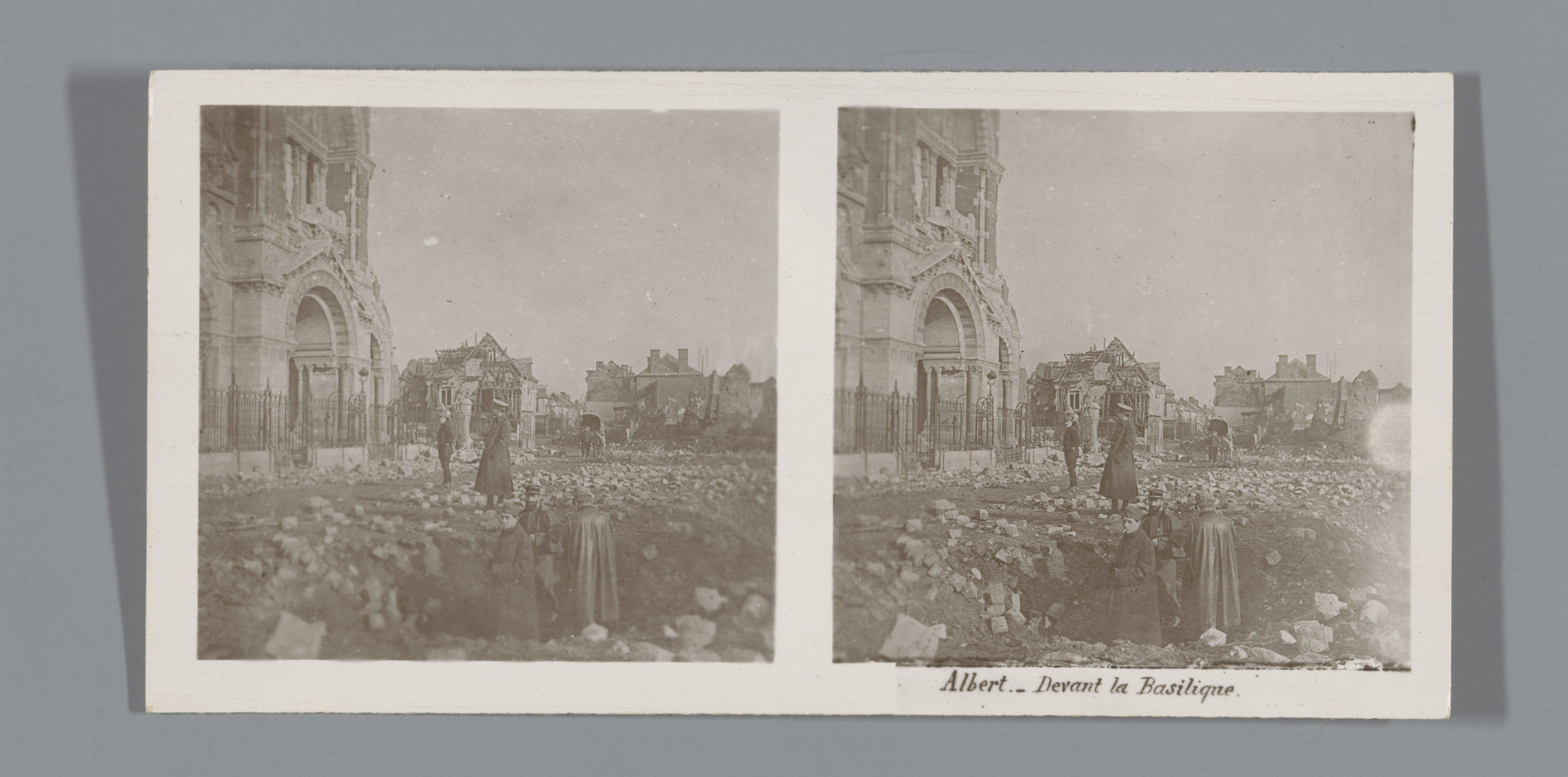
Soldiers in front of the basilica, 1914–1918

== See also ==
- Basilique Notre-Dame de Brebières French Wikipedia
- Christian symbolism
- Golden Madonna of Essen
- Mariology
- Monument
- Religious art
- Roman Catholic Marian art

== Works cited ==
- Aonghais, Clinton Mhic (2014). The Baker Boys. Bloomington, Indiana: Trafford Publishing. p. 380. ISBN 978-1-4907-3909-0.
- Bailey, Rosemary (April 2014). DK Eyewitness Travel Guide: France (ebook). United Kingdom: DK Publishing. p. 194. ISBN 978-1-4654-2176-0. ISBN, 1465421769.
- Fussell, Paul; Winter, J.M. (June 12, 2013). "Myth, Ritual, and Romance". The Great War and Modern Memory (Paperback) (New ed.). New York, New York: Oxford University Press. pp. 131–135. ISBN 978-0-19-997195-4.
- Holt, Tonie; Holt, Valmai (June 30, 2016). Somme 100th Anniversary (ebook). Yorkshire, England: Pen and Sword Books. ISBN 978-1-4738-6674-4.
- Holt, Tonie; Holt, Valmai; Gilbert, Martin (2008). Major and Mrs. Holt's Battlefield Guide to the Somme (ebook). United Kingdom: Pen and Sword Books. p. 116. ISBN 978-1-78303-509-0.
- Middlebrook, Martin (April 1, 2018). The First Day on the Somme: 1 July 1916. London England: Penguin Publishing. p. 51. ISBN 978-0-14-198160-4.
- Neiberg, Michael S. (February 16, 2014). The Western Front 1914–1916. Oxford, United Kingdom: Amber Books. p. 39. ISBN 978-1-908273-10-9.
- Roy, Christian (2005). Traditional Festivals: A Multicultural Encyclopedia (Hardcover). Vol. 1. United Kingdom: ABC-Clio. p. 76. ISBN 978-1-57607-089-5.
- Santoro, Nicholas J. (August 12, 2011). Mary in Our Life: Atlas of the Names and Titles of Mary, the Mother of Jesus, and Their Place in Marian Devotion (ebook). iUniverse. p. 171. ISBN 978-1-4620-4022-3.
- Sumner, Ian (November 30, 2018). The French Army on the Somme 1916 (ebook). Great Britain: Pen and Sword Military. p. 45. ISBN 978-1-5267-2548-6.
- Walsh, Michael (September 30, 2011). Brothers in War. London, United Kingdom: Ebury Publishing. p. 177. ISBN 978-1-4464-4615-7.
- Ziolkowski, Jan M. (2018). The Juggler of Notre Dame and the Medievalising of Modernity: The Middle Ages. Vol. 1. Open Book Publishers. pp. 24, 189.
- Stevenson, David (2004). Cataclysm: The First World War as Political Tragedy. New York: Basic Books. p. 560. ISBN 978-0-465-08184-4. OCLC 54001282.
- Tucker, Spencer C.; Roberts, Priscilla Mary (2005). Encyclopedia of World War I. Santa Barbara: ABC-Clio. ISBN 978-1-85109-420-2. OCLC 61247250.
