= Basilica of Our Lady of Brebières =

Basilica located in Albert, Somme, France

- Basilique Notre-Dame de Brebières (French)
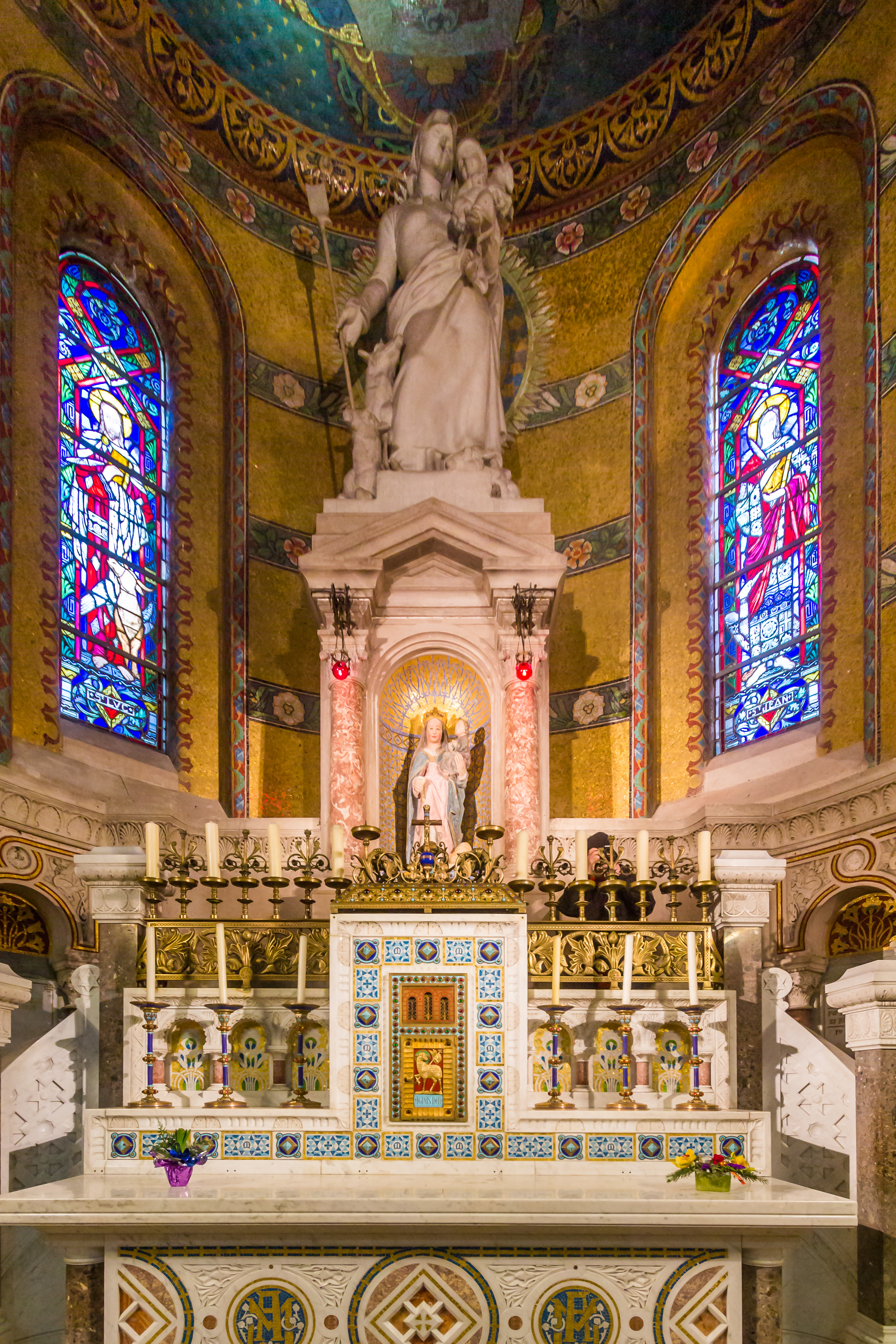
- The high altar in Basilica of Our Lady of Brebières
- Basilica of Our Lady of Brebières
- Location: France
- Denomination: Catholic
- Tradition: Roman Rite
- Website: Website

Architecture
- Architect(s): Edmond Duthoit & Louis Duthoit
- Style: Byzantine Revival architecture
- Groundbreaking: 1885
- Completed: End 1897

Administration
- Diocese: Roman Catholic Diocese

Clergy
- Bishop: Gérard Le Stang

The Basilica of Our Lady of Brebières, Basilique Notre-Dame de Brebières (French) is a Roman Catholic minor Basilica designed by Edmond Duthoit in 1897. The structure was completely destroyed during shelling in World War I and rebuilt by the original architect's son Louis Duthoit from 1927 to 1931.

The Golden Virgin sculpture designed by Albert Roze sits atop the dome of the Basilica and became an object of fascination during World War I.

Pope Leo XIII granted a decree of canonical coronation to the venerated image on 19 June 1901. Pious legends among soldiers at the time claimed a supernatural prophecy that when a German missile hits the prominent Marian statue above the church, the First World War would finally end.

== History ==
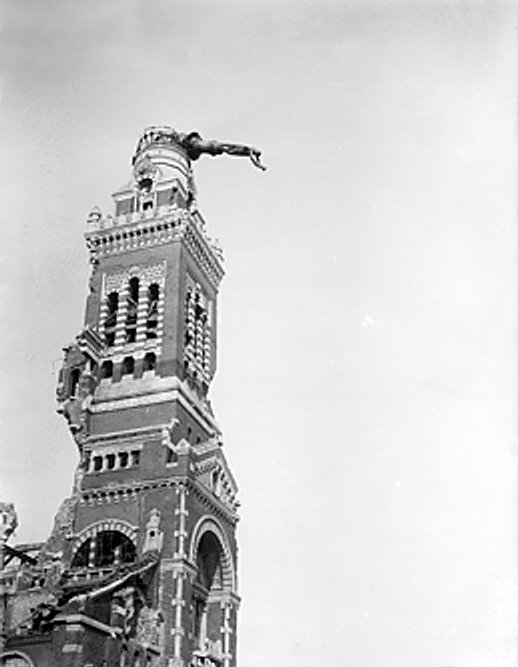
18 July 1916: The Golden Virgin hanging from the Church of Notre Dame in Albert. The soldiers' legend said that when the Virgin, which had been hit by German fire, fell, the war would end.

The Basilica started out as a parish church. In the 11th century many Catholics made pilgrimages to the parish church on the site to see a statue called "Our Lady of the Ewes" according to legend it had been found by a shepherd in the Middle Ages. Catholics passed around rumors of miracles related to the statue. In 1834 Pope Gregory XVI noticed the growth of the statue's legend and built a larger church at the location. Throughout the years grander churches were built and finally the Basilica of Our Lady of Brebières. A new large statue of Marian Art entitled The Golden Virgin was attached to the dome.

Construction on the Basilica began in 1885 and lasted until 1897. It was constructed with stone and red brick: the bell tower rises more than 200 ft (61 m). In 1901 Pope Leo XIII consecrated the church and, seeing the Golden Virgin, he called the Basilica the "Lourdes of the North". The sculpture was fastened to the 76 m (249 ft 4 in) bell tower.

== First world war ==
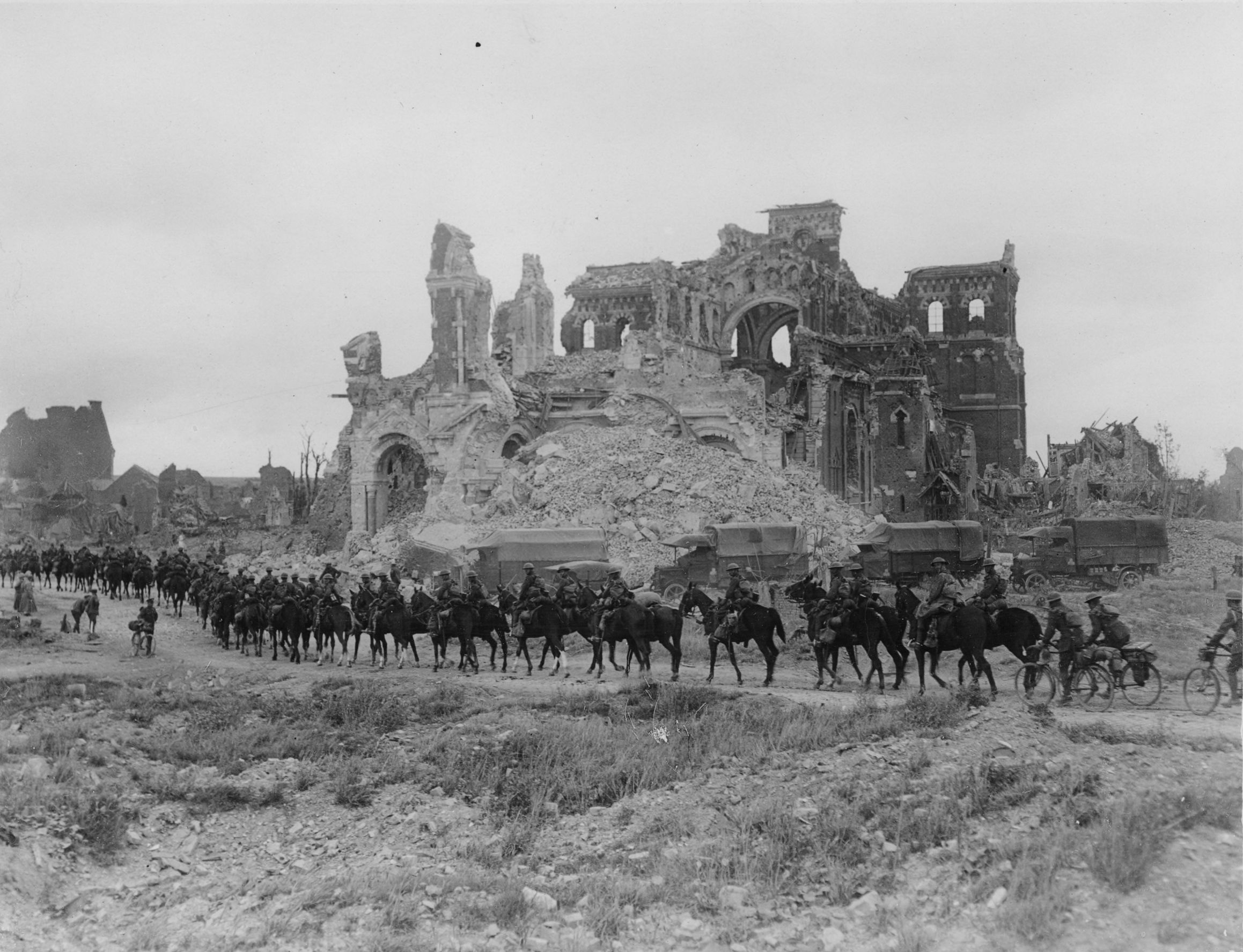
1918: British cavalry passing the ruins of Albert cathedral, France, during World War I

The Golden Virgin sculpture which stood on the dome of the Basilica was damaged During Battle of Albert 1914. In 1914 the French and Germans staged their troops in Albert, France and the German troops suspected that the French may use the bell tower as an observation post to direct military maneuvers, so beginning in October 1914 they shelled the dome.

By 7 January 1915 the dome was destroyed and by 21 January 1915 the base of The Golden Virgin was hit and the statue was knocked sideways past 90 degrees.

The Madonna and Child statue above the dome was damaged, separated, recast and placed upon the newly reconstructed basilica.

== See also ==
- List of Catholic basilicas
- Shrines to the Virgin Mary
