= Jules Verne's tomb =

Memorial located in Amiens, France

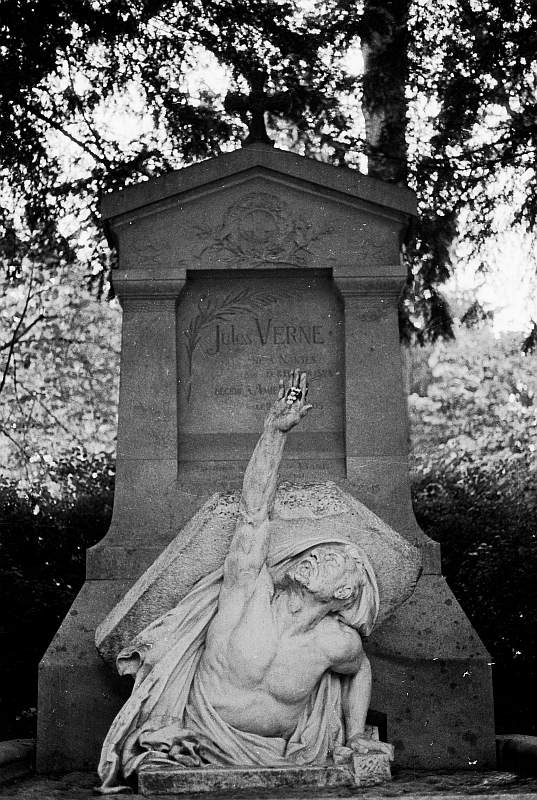
- Jules Verne's tomb in the cemetery at Amiens (Note: Sculptor Alber Roze created the sculpture from the actual death mask of Jules Verne. The sculpture was placed two years after Verne's death and is entitled, "Towards Immortality and Eternal Youth".)
- Interactive map of Jules Verne's tomb
- Location: Amiens, Departement de la Somme, Picardie, France Section N
- Coordinates: 49.914167°N 2.284722°E
- Designer: Albert Roze
- Material: Marble
- Beginning date: 1906
- Completion date: 1907
- Dedicated to: Jules Verne

Jules Verne's tomb is a grave memorial in Amiens, France La Madeleine Cemetery. It marks the grave of the 19th-century writer Jules Verne. The sculpture was designed by Albert Roze and it depicts a man breaking out of his grave and reaching skyward. Verne died March 24, 1905, and the sculpture was added to the gravesite in 1907.

== Background ==
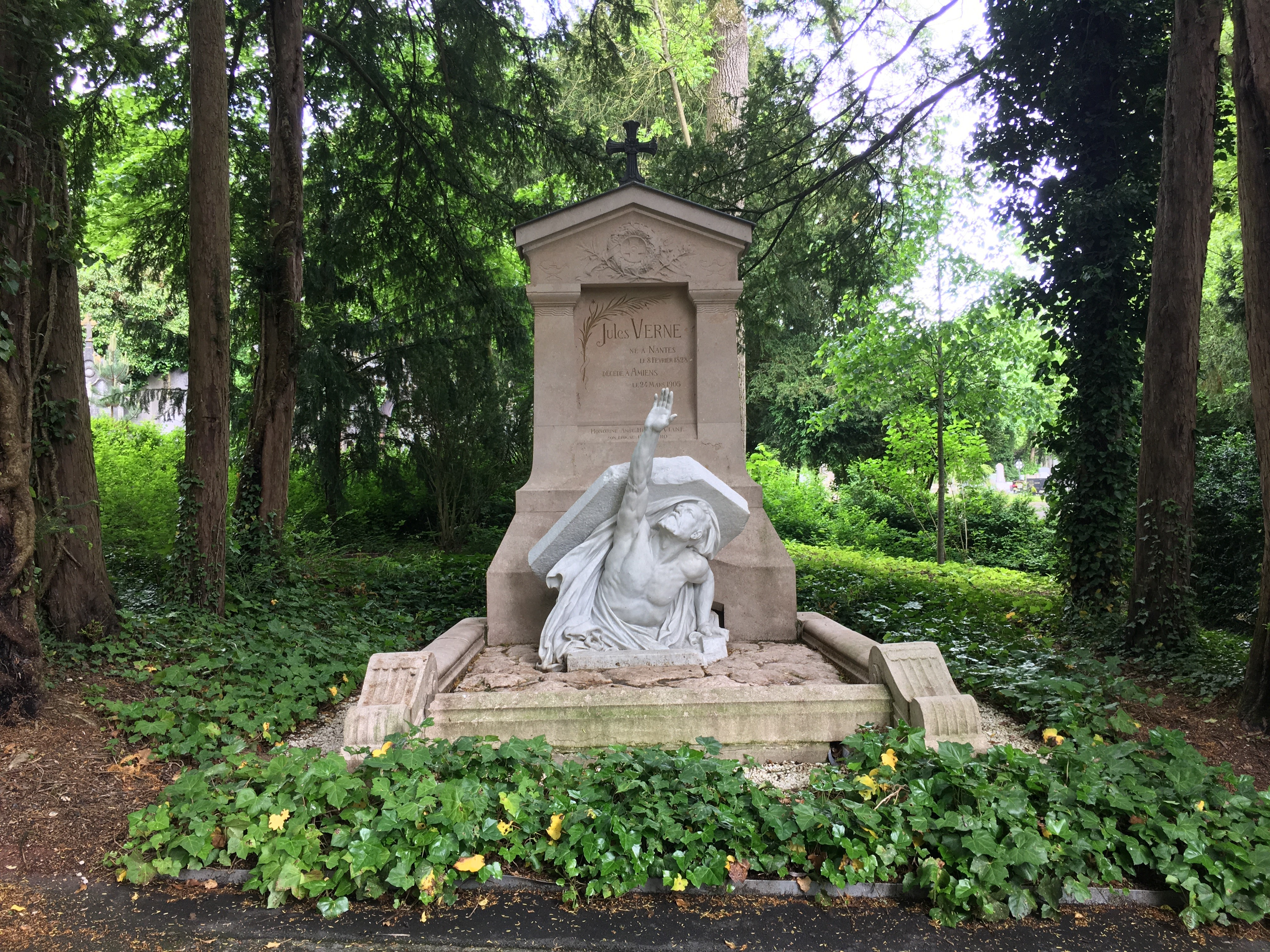
Jules Verne's tomb

In 1905 Jules Verne died in Amiens France, from chronic diabetes and complications from a stroke that paralyzed his right side. and two years later his tomb featured a dramatic sculpture of a man pushing his way out of the earth reaching to the heavens. The sculpture is entitled Vers l’immortalité et l’éternelle jeunesse ("Towards immortality and eternal youth"). It was announced in January 1907 sculptor Albert Roze would erect a monument at the Jules Verne gravesite.

The grave's sculpture has become a tourist attraction. The city of Amiens also features the tomb on their tourist page.

== See also ==
- Graves
- Grave marker
- Tomb
