= Albert Roze =

19th Century Sculptor

- Born: Albert Dominique Roze; August 4, 1861; France
- Died: October 17, 1952 (aged 91)
- Resting place: Amiens, Departement de la Somme, Picardie, France
- Known for: Sculpture
- Style: The Golden Virgin; Jules Verne's Tomb
- Awards: Gold medal at the 1897 Salon of French Artists.

Albert Dominique Roze (1861–1952) was a 19th-century sculptor from Amiens, France. He was a prolific sculptor creating many notable works displayed in public spaces in France.

== Career ==
One of his more important sculptures was entitled The Golden Virgin; it was destroyed in 1915 during World War I. The sculpture was placed on top of the Basilique Notre-Dame de Brebières. After World War I the statue was never recovered.

The sculpture of the Golden Virgin was recast and fitted atop the 76-meter bell tower in 1929, during the reconstruction of the Basilica 1927–1931.

=== Designs ===
Selected sculptures from Albert Rozen
| Name | Image | Year | Address | Notes/Refs. |
|---|---|---|---|---|
| Jules Verne's Tomb | | 1907 | 480, Rue St. Maurice Amiens, 80080 France | |
| Monument aux morts de Corbie | | 1907 | rue, Victor-Hugo, rue Jean-et-Marcelin-Truquin | |
| The Golden Virgin Basilique Notre-Dame de Brebières | | 1897 | 20 Rue Anicet Godin, 80300 Albert, France | |

== Awards ==
- Gold medal at the 1897 Salon of French Artists.
- A street in the city center of Amiens bears his name. (Rue Albert Roze Amiens France)
