= Battle of Albert =

The Battle of Albert may refer to:

- Battle of Albert (1914), an encounter battle during the Race to the Sea
- Battle of Albert (1916), the opening phase of the Battle of the Somme
- Battle of Albert (1918), the opening phase of the Second Battle of the Somme
