= W. O. H. Dodds =

Canadian Brigadier General

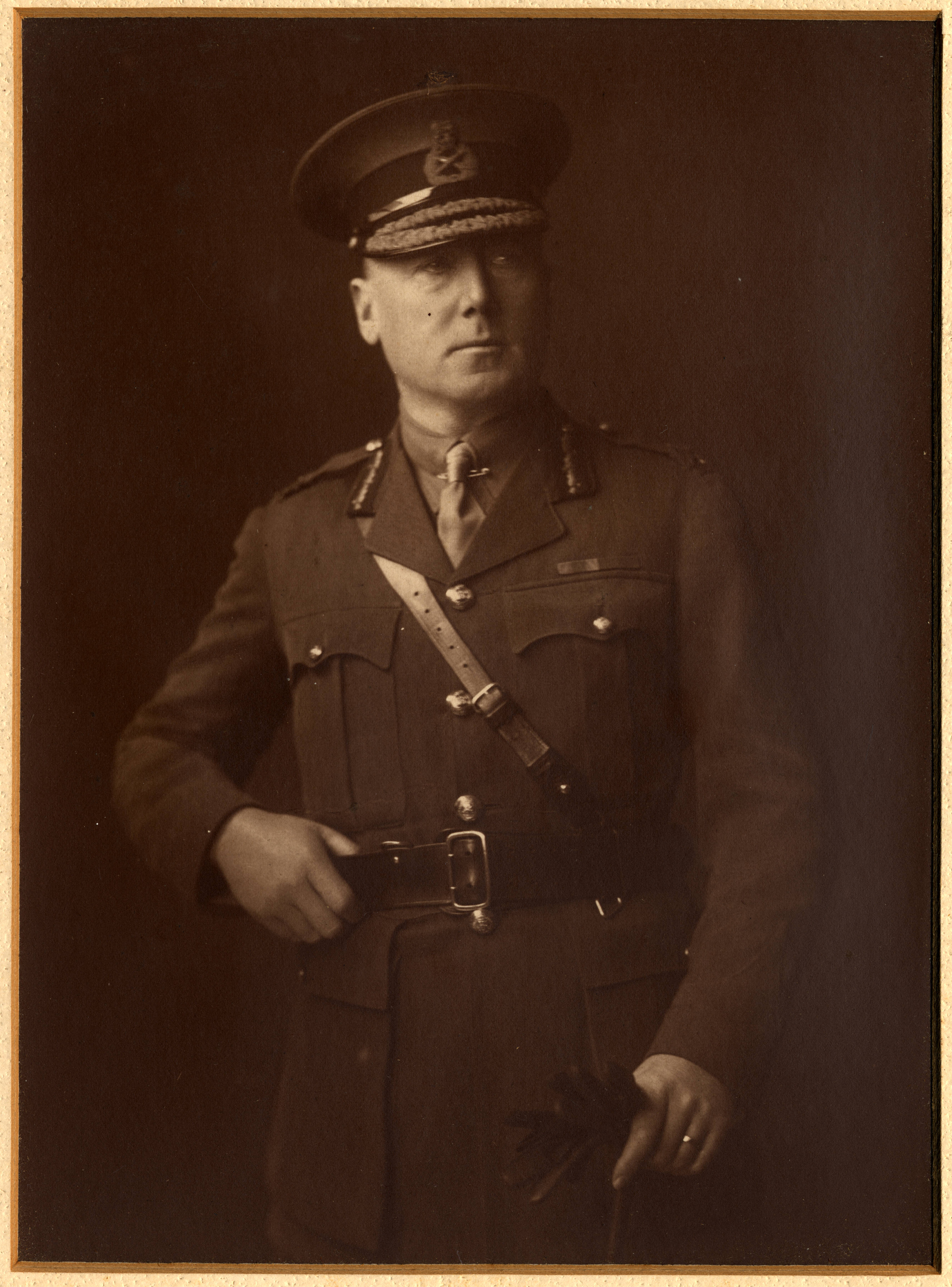
- Born: July 3, 1867; Yarmouth, Nova Scotia
- Died: August 25, 1934 (aged 67); Montreal, Quebec
- Military career
- Allegiance: Canada
- Rank: Brigadier General
- Conflicts: World War I

William Okell Holden Dodds CMG DSO (3 July 1867 – 25 August 1934) was a Canadian brigadier general of the First World War.

Dodds was born in Yarmouth, Nova Scotia, the son of Charles and Agnes (Smith) Dodds. In 1910 he married Jean Hamilton Holt Tyre.

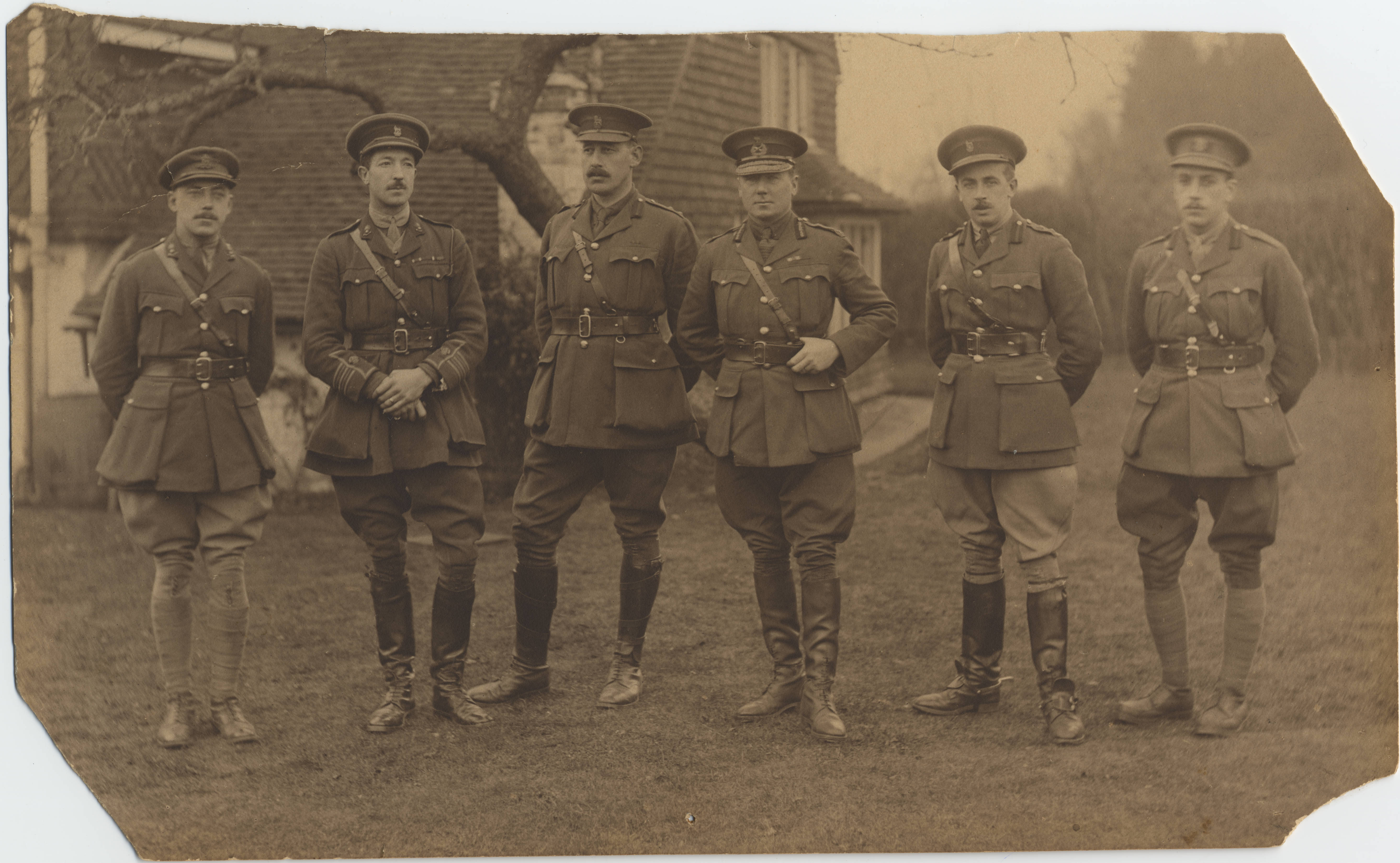
Artillery officers with Brigadier General Dodds, Headquarters, 4th Canadian Division Artillery, England, 1916.

A militia officer before the war, Dodds had served with the Canadian Garrison Artillery (1884-1886), the Royal Scots of Canada (1897-1905), the Canadian Field Artillery (1905-1912), and the Canadian Grenadier Guards (1912-1914).

Dodds joined the Canadian Expeditionary Force in 1914 as officer commanding the 1st Battery of the Canadian Field Artillery (CFA). After arrival in England, and being promoted lieutenant colonel, he became commanding officer of the 1st Brigade, CFA. In October 1916 he was promoted to brigadier general and given the position of Commander Royal Artillery for the 4th Canadian Division. After the end of hostilities, Dodds served in Germany and was briefly the military governor of Bonn.

He was made a Companion of the Order of St Michael and St George (CMG) in the 1916 Birthday Honours list. He was awarded the Distinguished Service Order (DSO) in the 1919 New Year Honours list.

Dodds returned to civilian life in 1919 and was later honorary colonel of the Royal Montreal Regiment and honorary colonel commandant, Canadian Artillery.

Dodds worked in the insurance industry, having joined the Mutual Life of New York in 1892. In 1916, while serving overseas, he was promoted to Canadian manager of the company.

Among his papers, which are held at the University of Victoria, is a photo album of people and scenes of the First World War which is now in the public domain.
