= Samuel W. Martien =

American politician (1854–1946)

Samuel Winter Martien

Louisiana State Representative for Tensas Parish
- In office 1906–1920
- Preceded by: Robert H. Snyder
- Succeeded by: Louis T. Hunter

Personal details
- Born: November 12, 1854 Massachusetts, USA
- Died: May 31, 1946 (aged 91) Roanoke, Virginia
- Resting place: Natchez City Cemetery in Natchez, Mississippi
- Party: Democratic Party
- Spouse: Ella Jane Hopkins Martien (married 1885-1920, her death)
- Children: Ten children Two died in childhood.
- Occupation: Cotton planter

Samuel Winter Martien (November 12, 1854 – May 31, 1946) was a wealthy cotton planter who served as a Democrat from 1906 to 1920 in the Louisiana House of Representatives from his adopted Tensas Parish in northeastern Louisiana.

At the time, each Louisiana parish regardless of population had at least one representative. That advantage was lost completely to rural parishes in 1972, when both legislative chambers came into full compliance with the United States Supreme Court decision Reynolds v. Sims, which requires that each state legislative district be nearly equal in population. In recent census reports, Tensas Parish, which is majority African American, has been the smallest parish in the state in population, and the numbers continue to decline.

Robert H. Snyder of St. Joseph, who had been the lieutenant governor from 1896 to 1900, died in 1906 while serving as House Speaker. Martien (pronounced MAR TEEN) first won a special election to choose a successor to Snyder and then secured full terms in 1908, 1912, and 1916.

== Large family ==
Martien was born in Massachusetts to Jacob Martien (1824-1904) and the former Mary J. Bigham McMachlin (1829-1909). Jacob and Mary moved from near Boston to Louisiana after the American Civil War. Early in 1885, Samuel Martien married Ella Jane Hopkins in Acadia Parish in South Louisiana. At some point thereafter, all the Martiens relocated to the cotton-rich country about Waterproof in southern Tensas Parish near the boundary with Concordia Parish. Samuel and Ella had two children who died early in life, infant daughter Ella (1888-1889) and son Harold B. Martien (1897-1900). Martien had four surviving daughters, Mrs. Edgar Funkhouser of Roanoke, Virginia, Mrs. Paul Caldwell of Dinuba, California, and Mrs. Wilma C. Gibson and Mary Louise Martien, both of Waterproof. There were four sons too, William J. Martien (1886-1938), Norman Hopkins Martien, Sr. (1893-1958), Carey Martien of Crowley, Louisiana, and Winter Martien (1905-1994).

Grandson Norman Hopkins Martien, Jr. (1926-2012), a Waterproof native, was a graduate in chemical engineering of Louisiana Tech University in Ruston and an engineering project manager for Kaiser Aluminum in Gramercy, Louisiana. At the time of his death, he had been residing for many years in Denham Springs near Baton Rouge. The junior Martien's mother was the former Mabel Rowan, a native of Newellton in northern Tensas Parish.

In 1946, the year that his grandfather died, the junior Martien married Rosemary Louise Chennault (1928-2013), the youngest daughter of Lieutenant General Claire Chennault of the Flying Tigers by Chennault's first marriage to the former Nell Thompson of Waterproof. She was born in San Antonio, Texas, where Chennault was then stationed. Norman and Rosemary, who was reared in Waterproof, had three children, Nell Calloway (named for her grandmother), James Martien, and Norman Martien, III. Rosemary was a secretary and office manager at Prudential Insurance in Monroe for nearly thirty years. Rosemary later married the late Jim Simrall; Norman, Jr., subsequently wed Helen S. Martien and acquired a stepson. Nell Martien Calloway is a great-granddaughter of Samuel Winter Martien and a granddaughter of General Chennault; she is the director of the Chennault Aviation and Military Museum at the Monroe Regional Airport in Monroe, Louisiana

Among other extended Martien descendants is Winter H. Martien, a great-grandson who resides in Natchez, Mississippi. Another great-grandson, Samuel Winter Martien (born c. 1946), resides in Pineville in Rapides Parish, Louisiana.

== Death at 91 ==
Martien, who was Episcopalian, died at the age of ninety-one, some twenty-six years after the passing of his wife. He spent his last years in Roanoke, Virginia, where he lived there with a daughter. Martien, his wife, and children are interred at Natchez City Cemetery in Natchez, Mississippi.

== See also ==
Other Tensas Parish contemporary legislators:

- Daniel F. Ashford
- Clifford Cleveland Brooks
- George Henry Clinton
- Charles C. Cordill
- Joseph T. Curry
- Thomas M. Wade

Political offices
Preceded by Robert H. Snyder	Louisiana State Representative from Tensas Parish; 1906–1920	Succeeded by Louis T. Hunter
