= George Henry Clinton =

American politician

Louisiana State Representative for Tensas Parish
- In office 1908–1912
- Preceded by: Harrison Stewart
- Succeeded by: John Murdock

Louisiana State Senator for Concordia and Tensas parishes
- In office 1912–1916
- Preceded by: Charles C. Cordill
- Succeeded by: Frank L. Guthrie

Louisiana State Senator for Concordia and Tensas parishes
- In office 1920–1924
- Preceded by: Frank L. Guthrie
- Succeeded by: Clifford Cleveland Brooks; Norris C. Williamson

Personal details
- Born: Date of birth missing Natchez, Mississippi, USA
- Died: Date and place of death missing
- Resting place: Unknown
- Party: Democratic
- Education: Chamberlain-Hunt Academy; Louisiana State University
- Occupation: Chemist; Lawyer

George Henry Clinton was a chemist, lawyer, and Democratic politician from St. Joseph in Tensas Parish in the northeastern Mississippi River delta of the U.S. state of Louisiana.

Clinton was born in the late 1860s in Natchez in western Mississippi. His father was a native of East Feliciana Parish, one of the Florida Parishes of southeastern Louisiana. The senior Clinton served in the Confederate Army and became the district attorney for the Louisiana 6th Judicial District, based about St. Joseph, Tallulah in Madison Parish, and Lake Providence in East Carroll Parish. Clinton's mother was part of the Briscoe family of Claiborne County, Mississippi.

Clinton attended school in New Orleans and at the Chamberlain-Hunt Academy in Port Gibson, Mississippi, before he graduated in 1889 from Louisiana State University in Baton Rouge. Clinton worked as a sugar chemist in Louisiana, Cuba, and Mexico. In 1898, he began his legal practice in St. Joseph. Clinton served on the LSU Board of Supervisors.

He was a state representative from 1908 to 1912, having served alongside the cotton planter Samuel W. Martien of Waterproof in southern Tensas Parish. He was twice a state senator, from 1912 to 1916 and again from 1920 to 1924. Clinton also served on the Louisiana Board of Appraisers and was a director of the East Louisiana State Hospital. He was a member and president of the Tensas Parish School Board, based in St. Joseph, and a delegate to the 1913 and 1921 state constitutional conventions.

Nothing is known of Clinton after he left the state Senate in 1924. He is not buried in Legion Memorial Cemetery in Newellton nor is he listed at Natchez City Cemetery, the resting place of most whites in St. Joseph until the middle to late 1940s.

Political offices
Preceded by Harrison Stewart	Louisiana State Representative from Tensas Parish; George Henry Clinton; 1908–1912	Succeeded by John Murdock
Preceded by Charles C. Cordill	Louisiana State Senator from Concordia and Tensas parishes George Henry Clinton; 1912–1916	Succeeded by Frank L. Guthrie
Preceded by Frank L. Guthrie	Louisiana State Senator from Concordia and Tensas parishes George Henry Clinton; 1920–1924	Succeeded by Clifford Cleveland Brooks; Norris C. Williamson
