= Thomas M. Wade =

American politician

Thomas Magruder Wade, I

Louisiana State Representative for Tensas Parish
- In office 1888–1904
- Preceded by: John Murdock
- Succeeded by: Harrison Stewart

Personal details
- Born: October 24, 1860 Prospect Hill Plantation, Claiborne County; Mississippi, USA
- Died: January 22, 1929 (aged 68)
- Resting place: Winter Green Cemetery in Port Gibson, Mississippi
- Party: Democratic Party
- Spouse: Anna Thomas Magruder Wade (married 1883-1918, divorced but remained single on both sides)
- Children: Thomas M. Wade, II Grandchildren: Thomas Wade, III; Burton LaCour Wade Anna Wade
- Occupation: Educator; Politician

Thomas Magruder Wade, I (October 24, 1860 – January 22, 1929), was an educator, politician, and civic leader from Newellton in Tensas Parish in northeastern Louisiana.

== Biography ==
Wade was born at the Prospect Hill Plantation in Jefferson County near Fayette, Mississippi, to Isaac Ross Wade (1814–1891) and the former Catherine Elizabeth Dunbar (1820–1865). Of Scottish descent, Wade was affiliated with the Clan Gregor Society.

From 1888 to 1904, he served as a Democrat in the Louisiana House of Representatives. During part of his legislative tenure, Wade served alongside Robert H. Snyder of St. Joseph, who was a House Speaker. Two years after Wade left the House, Samuel W. Martien, a large cotton planter from Waterproof in southern Tensas Parish, began a 14-year tenure in the House.

Wade was a delegate to the 1898 Louisiana Constitutional Convention. He served on the Louisiana State Board of Education from 1896 to 1900 during the second administration of Governor Murphy J. Foster Sr. Such dual office-holding is no longer permitted in Louisiana. Wade also served on the Tensas Parish School Board and, he was thereafter appointed and served for at least twenty years as the Tensas school superintendent, long one of the most important positions in the small parish nestled along oxbow lakes next to the Mississippi River. In 1883, Wade married his third cousin, Anna Thomas Magruder (1862–1918). Both he and his wife had lost their mothers in early childhood. Anna's husband was named for her father, Dr. Thomas Baldwin Magruder (1800–1885), of Port Gibson in Claiborne County in southwestern Mississippi.

Anna Magruder Wade was seriously injured in a horse-and-buggy accident in 1912. After weeks of therapy, she recovered from her wounds though she had been at the point of death on several occasions. She was treated in Chattanooga, Tennessee, by her husband's nephew, Dr. Edward D. Newell Jr., son of Edward D. Newell, for whom Newellton is named. Anna Wade also spent time in a sanitarium in New Orleans. Nevertheless, she died in Newellton in 1918 at the age of fifty-six of a different problem, toxiema.

A biographical sketch of his parents by Thomas Wade, II, reveals their Christian commitment through the Episcopal Church. Thomas Wade was a widower for the remaining decade of his life.

Thomas and Anna Wade and other family members are interred at Winter Green Cemetery in Port Gibson, Mississippi.

== Family legacy ==
The Wades had one child, Thomas Wade, II (1889–1971), a lawyer in the Tensas parish seat of St. Joseph, who later lived in Missoula, Montana, and El Dorado, Arkansas, where he died at the age of eighty-two. From his first marriage in 1913 to the former Kate Burton LaCour of Shreveport in far northwestern Louisiana, he had two children, namesake sons, Thomas Wade, III (1914–2012), and Burton LaCour Wade, I (1923–1998). From a second marriage to his then surviving widow, the former Mary Gwendolyn Webb, he had a daughter, Miss Anna Wade of El Dorado.

Grandson Thomas Wade, III, was first an attorney and from 1940 to 1942 the mayor of St. Joseph before he enlisted in the United States Navy during World War II. Thereafter, he graduated from the theological seminary of the University of the South in Sewanee, Tennessee, and became an ordained Episcopal priest with service between 1957 and 1979 in DeRidder, Minden, Baton Rouge, and Pineville, Louisiana. After he retired from the ministry, he spent his last years in St. Joseph. He and his wife of sixty-six years, Alma Fluitt Wade, originally from Haynesville, Louisiana, had two children.

Political offices
Preceded by John Murdock	Louisiana State Representative from Tensas Parish; 1888–1904	Succeeded by Harrison Stewart
