= Clifford Cleveland Brooks =

American politician

Louisiana State Senator for Tensas, Concordia, Madison, and East Carroll parishes
- In office 1924–1932
- Preceded by: George Henry Clinton
- Succeeded by: Daniel B. Fleming; Andrew L. Sevier

Personal details
- Born: September 19, 1886 Lexington, Georgia, US
- Died: October 16, 1944 (aged 58)
- Party: Democratic
- Spouse: Linda Mae Sibley (married 1915-1944, his death)
- Occupation: Cotton planter

Clifford Cleveland Brooks, also known as C. C. Brooks (September 19, 1886 – October 16, 1944), was a Georgia native who served as a Democrat from 1924 to 1932 in the Louisiana State Senate. Brooks represented the delta parishes: Tensas, Madison, East Carroll, and Concordia, a rich farming region along the Mississippi River in eastern Louisiana ranging from Vidalia to Tallulah to Lake Providence. At the time, two state senators served from the four-parish district.

== Background ==
Brooks was born in Lexington in Oglethrope County in northeastern Georgia, to George Washington Brooks and the former Ida Stokes Briscoe. Brooks was given his middle name to honor U.S. President Grover Cleveland. Brooks graduated in 1908 from the University of Georgia at Athens, where he was active in athletic and fraternal activities. He had planned to study medicine but instead moved west for health reasons and sold real estate in Pauls Valley in Garvin County in southern Oklahoma. Thereafter, he was a cotton broker in Shreveport in far northwestern Louisiana.

== Political career ==
In 1918, Brooks came to Tensas Parish, where two years later, he purchased the Botany Bay Plantation on Lake Bruin near the parish seat of government of St. Joseph. In the Senate, he was assigned to the Agriculture, Land, and Levees committees. Brooks was also the chairman of the Senate Public Parks and Public Buildings Committee He served alongside Norris C. Williamson of East Carroll Parish, an unwavering conservative and an unyielding critic of Governor Huey Pierce Long, Jr. Williamson retired to private life in 1932, rather than face likely defeat at the hands of the Longites, and his seat passed to Andrew L. Sevier of Tallulah.

Brooks was unseated in his 1932 bid for a third Senate term by the banker Daniel B. Fleming of Ferriday in Concordia Parish. Himself generally anti-Long in the preceding term, Brooks equivocated regarding Longism and disappointed some of his original supporters who felt that he had not stood by his principles. Josiah Scott, editor of the Tensas Gazette, wrote that Brooks had "a way of 'standing in' with both sides .... keeping posted on all that goes on in the camp of his friends and in the camp of his enemies alike." Scott noted that Brooks had found ways to get policies and programs supported in the delta, such as bridge work, approved despite the general hostility of the Long administration. In December 1931, Brooks appeared at a Long rally in Lake Providence in East Carroll Parish on behalf of Long's chosen successor as governor, O. K. Allen. Brooks endorsed Allen for governor and promised if retained in the Senate to support the Long-Allen agenda over the next four years. Brooks, however, was caught between pro-Long sentiment in the lower delta which coalesced behind Fleming and the conservative planter candidate, Andrew Sevier, in the upper delta. Two seats were at stake; Fleming and Sevier prevailed, with Brooks cast aside for reelection. Emerging pro-Long voters in Brooks' own Tensas Parish even turned to Fleming.

== Personal life ==
Brooks was affiliated with the Knights of Pythias. In 1915, he married the former Linda Mae Sibley, a native of Bossier Parish, who was residing with her parents in Shreveport. Linda took an active role in civic matters and founded the first Girl Scout troop in St. Joseph. Four years after Brooks' death, Linda married Dr. George Watts Dubuisson, who died in 1952. She continued to operate Botany Bay Plantation after the deaths of both husbands. She died at the since defunct St. Charles Legion Memorial Hospital in Newellton.

== See also ==
Related names in Tensas Parish agriculture:

- Daniel F. Ashford
- Elliot D. Coleman
- Charles C. Cordill
- Joseph T. Curry
- Samuel W. Martien

Preceded by George Henry Clinton	Louisiana State Senator for Concordia, Tensas, Madison, and East Carroll parishes Clifford Cleveland Brooks; 1924–1932	Succeeded by Daniel B. Fleming; Andrew L. Sevier
