= Joseph T. Curry =

American politician (1895–1961)

Joseph Tullis Curry

Louisiana State Representative for Tensas Parish
- In office 1930–1944
- Preceded by: Daniel F. Ashford
- Succeeded by: J.C. Seaman

Personal details
- Born: July 26, 1895 St. Joseph, Tensas Parish; Louisiana, USA
- Died: August 21, 1961 (aged 66)
- Resting place: Natchez City Cemetery in Natchez, Mississippi
- Party: Democratic
- Spouse: Rita Camors Curry (died 1944)
- Children: Josephine Curry Evans (1935–1961)
- Education: Culver Military Academy; University of Virginia
- Occupation: Cotton planter

Joseph Tullis Curry (July 24, 1895 - August 21, 1961) was a cotton planter from St. Joseph in Tensas Parish in northeastern Louisiana, who served from 1930 to 1944 as a Democrat in the Louisiana House of Representatives.

== Background ==
His father, Joseph Curry (1855-1919), is often mistakenly referred to as "Sr." to avoid confusion with the son, whose middle name is derived not from the father but from the maiden name of his mother, the former Dorcea "Dot" Tullis. The senior Curry, a merchant and planter, had been part of the posse in 1878 which apprehended some one thousand African Americans in a revolt near Waterproof against then parish judge and later State Senator Charles C. Cordill. The senior Curry was first a deputy sheriff and then was elected Tensas Parish clerk of court, a position which he retained for many years. Dot Curry's brothers were Robert Lee Tullis (c. 1865–1955), a former secretary to a mayor of New Orleans and thereafter a longtime professor and dean of the Louisiana State University Law Center in Baton Rouge, and Hugh Tullis (1857-1931), an attorney and district judge in the delta country. Curry's cousin, Garner Hugh Tullis, served for three terms as the president of the New Orleans Cotton Exchange.

Curry attended Culver Military Academy in Culver, Indiana, and the University of Virginia at Charlottesville, Virginia. He was a United States Army officer during World War I.

Like most of the Tensas Parish planters, Curry was a member of the Episcopal Church. He was also affiliated with the Masonic lodge.

== Career ==
After military service, Curry became the secretary-treasurer of the Panola Company, a large agricultural operation in St. Joseph. He was a member of the Chamber of Commerce and a director of the Bank of St. Joseph. He was part of a contingent from Tensas Parish who successfully lobbied in Washington, D.C., to block construction of the proposed Eudora Floodway, named for Eudora, Arkansas, the origin of Bayou Macon. The flood would have run near the boundary of East Carroll and West Carroll parishes and potentially placed vast Louisiana acreage to the south and east in danger in the event of severe flooding like that which had occurred in 1927.

Curry won a special election for the House after Daniel F. Ashford, another St. Joseph planter, died in office in 1929. Curry was chairman for part of his tenure of the Public Works, Lands, and Levee Committee, a panel of particular importance to the parishes along the Mississippi River. Originally anti-Long, like most of the planter class, Curry by his second full term had begun to vote increasingly with the Long faction that he had first opposed. Sheriff Elliot D. Coleman, who served from 1936 to 1960, was also staunchly pro-Long; indeed he had been a bodyguard at the assassination in Baton Rouge in 1935 of Huey Long, and claimed to have fired two shots at proclaimed assassin Carl Weiss. The 1935-1936 state elections, with memory of Huey Long's demise fresh in the minds of voters, proved devastating to many anti-Longites. The yeoman and tenant farmers gained the voter majority over the planters and business class. Where planters remained in office they did so through their political flexibility. The particular blot to the planter came with the unseating in 1936 of U.S. Representative Riley J. Wilson, one of Huey Long's unsuccessful gubernatorial primary opponents in 1928.

Curry was married to the former Rita Camors (1901-1944). He was a widower for the last seventeen years of his life. He died some five weeks after the passing of their daughter, Josephine Curry Evans (1935-1961). The Currys, including his parents, are interred at Natchez City Cemetery in Natchez, Mississippi.

== See also ==
Related names in Tensas Parish agriculture:

- Daniel F. Ashford
- Clifford Cleveland Brooks
- Elliot D. Coleman
- Charles C. Cordill
- Samuel W. Martien
- Clyde V. Ratcliff

Political offices
Preceded by Daniel F. Ashford	Louisiana State Representative for Tensas Parish; Joseph Tullis Curry; 1930–1944	Succeeded by J.C. Seaman
