= Waterproof High School =

- U.S. National Register of Historic Places
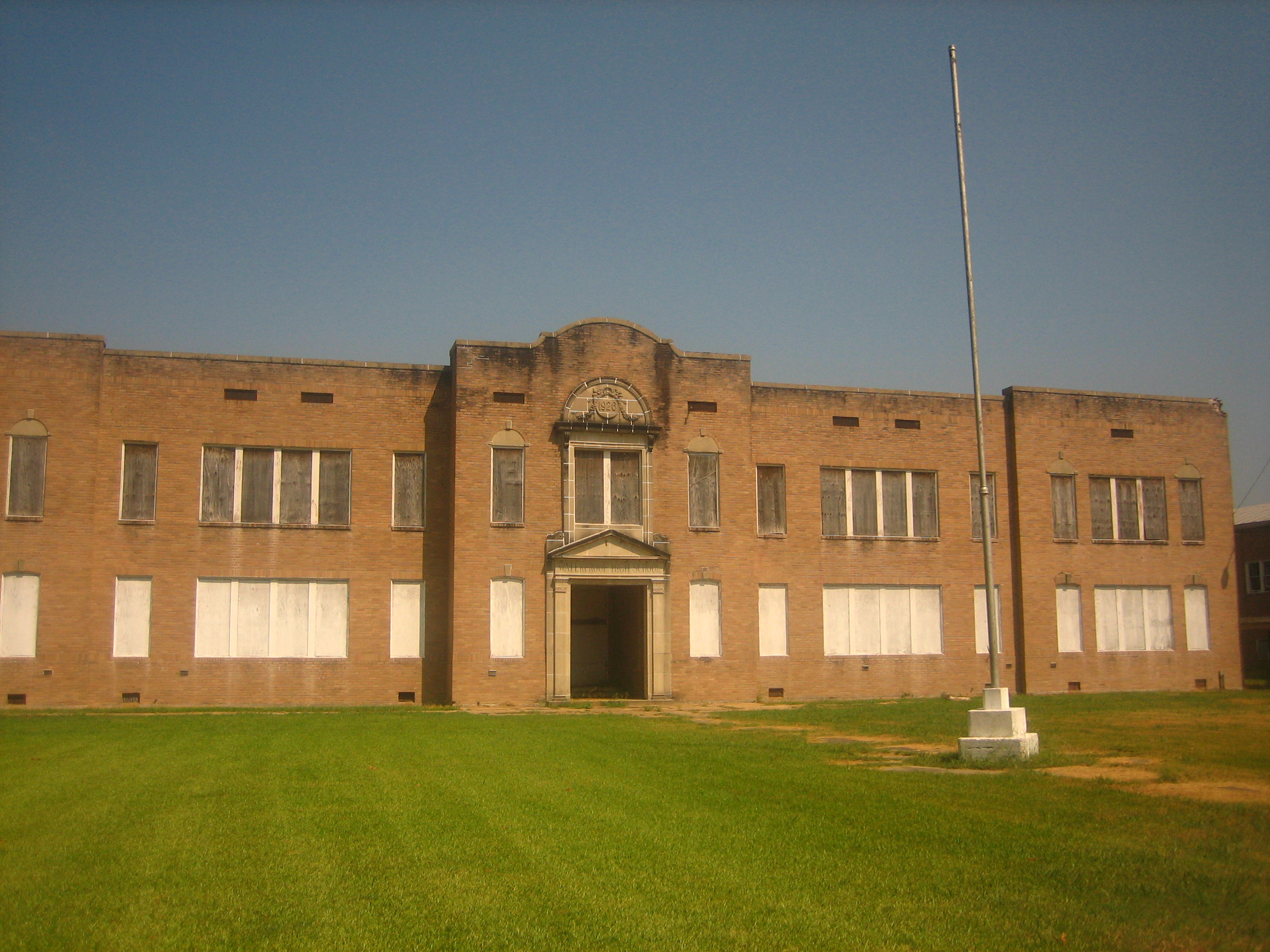

- Location within Louisiana Location within the United States
- Location: Main St., bet. Church Ln. and Mississippi St., Waterproof, Louisiana
- Coordinates: 31°48′36″N 91°22′48″W
- Area: 1.5 acres (0.61 ha)
- Built: 1926
- Built by: G.H. Pannell and W.E. Spink
- Architect: W.E. Stephens, W.E. Spink
- Architectural style: Classical Revival
- NRHP reference No.: 02000296
- Added to NRHP: April 1, 2002

Waterproof High School, in Waterproof, Louisiana, in Tensas Parish is a high school whose former building was built in 1926. The former high school is located on Main St. between Church Lane and Mississippi Street.

The building was designed by W.E. Stephens and W.E. Spink and features a Classical Revival central pavilion. It was listed on the National Register of Historic Places in 2002.

== Athletics ==
Waterproof High athletics competes in the LHSAA.

=== Championships ===
Football Championships

- (1) State Championship: 1943

== Notable alumni ==
- J. C. Seaman (1898–1964), member of the Louisiana House of Representatives
