= Norris C. Williamson =

American politician

Norris Charles Craft Williamson
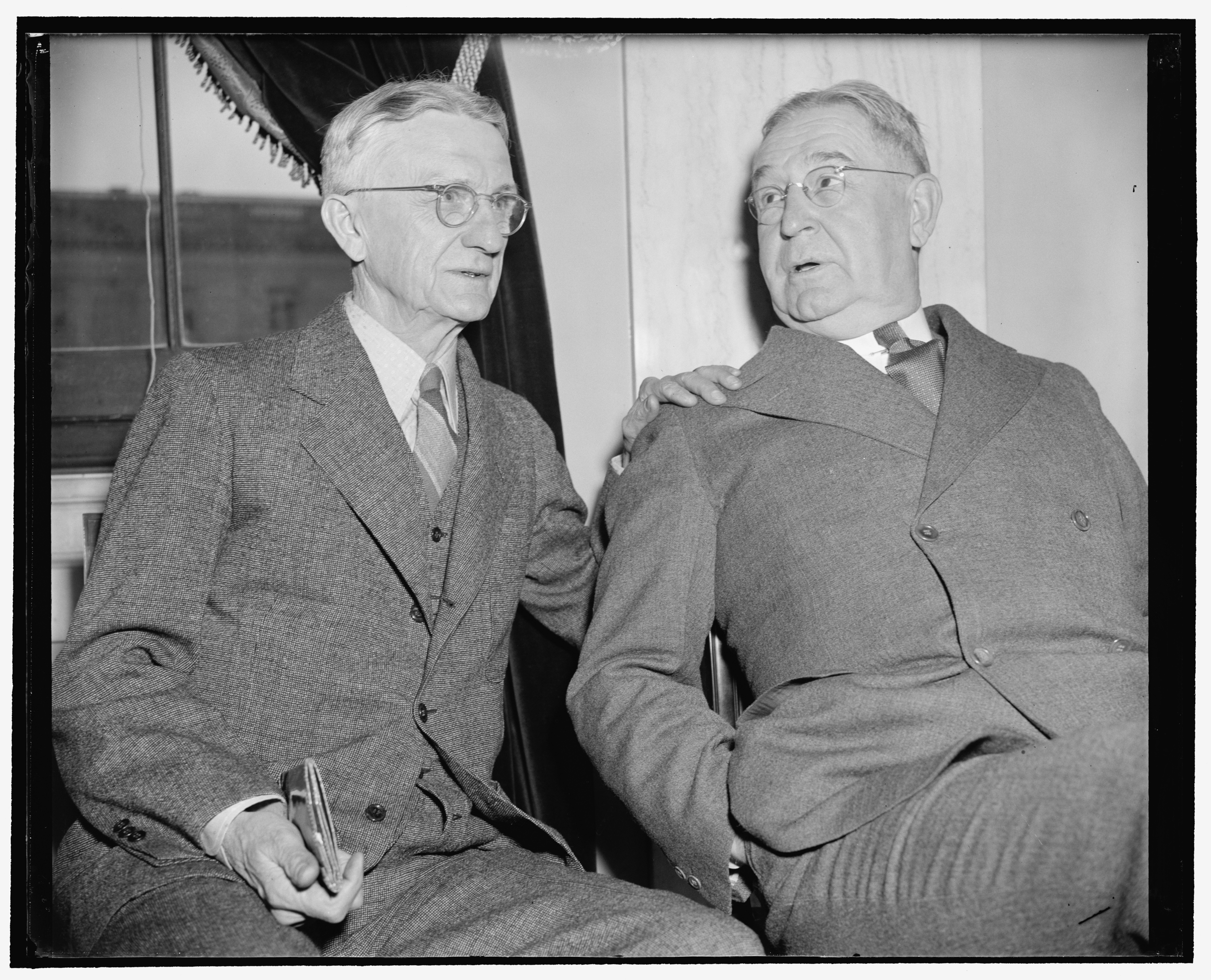

Louisiana State Senator for Tensas, Concordia, Madison, and East Carroll parishes
- In office 1924–1932
- Preceded by: George Henry Clinton
- Succeeded by: Andrew L. Sevier; Daniel B. Fleming

Personal details
- Born: July 31, 1874 Salem, Mississippi, US
- Died: 1949 (aged c. 75)
- Resting place: Lake Providence Cemetery in Lake Providence, Louisiana
- Party: Democratic
- Spouse: Sally Cooke Williamson (married 1918)
- Children: 1
- Occupation: Cotton planter

Norris Charles Craft Williamson (July 31, 1874 – 1949) was a Democrat who served from 1924 to 1932 in the Louisiana State Senate. A resident of Lake Providence, Williamson represented the delta parishes: Tensas, Madison, East Carroll, and Concordia, a rich farming region along the Mississippi River. Included in his district were Vidalia, Ferriday, St. Joseph, and Tallulah. At the time, two state senators represented the four-parish district.

== Background ==
Williamson was born in the now ghost town of Salem in Benton County, one of the six northernmost counties of Mississippi. His parents were the former Josephine Leggett and Albert W. Williamson. In 1897, Norris Williamson received his Bachelor of Science degree from Mississippi State University in Starkville, an institution then only seventeen years old. On July 4, 1897, he relocated to East Carroll Parish in far northeastern Louisiana to become a contractor in the construction of levees along the Mississippi River. In 1904, he purchased the Owenton Plantation. In 1920, he closed the construction business to devote full-time to the 4,000-acre Wilton Plantation, where he raised cotton, cattle, and grains. The historically black Union Baptist Church No. 1 was built on Williamson lands in 1928.

In 1918, at age of forty-two, Williamson married the former Sally Cooke (1887–1976), daughter of H. Brent Cooke and the former Rachel Wilson of Louisville, Kentucky. In 1922, he joined others in the organization of the Louisiana Farm Bureau Federation and was a member of the original board of directors. In 1923, he worked to organize the Louisiana and the American cotton cooperative associations. Williamson co-founded and served on the executive committee of the National Council of Farmer Cooperatives. In 1928, he and Sally adopted a seven-year-old daughter, Norris Williamson, who later married Joseph Lawrence Brock. Norris Brock died in 1948 at the age of twenty-seven, a year before her father's death. In 1944, twelve years after Williamson's Senate tenure ended, Progressive Farmer magazine declared him "Man of the Year" because of his service to agriculture. Williamson was a member of the Masonic lodge.

== Political career ==
From 1912 to 1916, Williamson was the president of the East Carroll Parish Police Jury, the governing body of the parish, akin to county commissions in most other states. He left the police jury upon his election to the state Senate. As the chairman of the Senate Agriculture Committee, As a freshman senator, Williamson in 1917 introduced a bill calling for state funding for the eradication of the cattle tick pest, and it was signed into law by Governor Ruffin Pleasant.

Williamson supported woman's suffrage through ratification of the Nineteenth Amendment to the United States Constitution. He was an alternate delegate to the 1940 Democratic National Convention, which nominated the Roosevelt-Wallace ticket. The Louisiana delegation was led by then Governor Sam Houston Jones, the leader of the anti-Long faction.

Williamson served alongside Senator Clifford Cleveland Brooks, a planter from St. Joseph in Tensas Parish. Williamson was an unwavering conservative and an unyielding critic of Governor Huey Pierce Long, Jr. In June 1929, he was named vice-president of the anti-Long Constitutional League of Louisiana, which was organized in the St. Charles Hotel in New Orleans to "save the state from Long". The president of the organization was former Governor John M. Parker.

Williamson retired to private life in 1932, rather than face likely defeat at the hands of the Longites, and his seat passed to Andrew L. Sevier of Tallulah, who remained in the post until his death in 1962. Brooks was unseated in 1932 by the banker Daniel B. Fleming of Ferriday in Concordia Parish. Whereas Williamson had refused to compromise with the Long faction and retired from politics, Brooks ran again, equivocated in his last campaign regarding Longism and disappointed some of his original supporters who felt that he had not stood by his principles. Brooks was unseated, even the loser to Fleming in his own Tensas Parish.

Norris and Sally Williamson, who outlived her husband by twenty-seven years, are interred at Lake Providence Cemetery.

Preceded by George Henry Clinton	Louisiana State Senator for Concordia, Tensas, Madison, and East Carroll parishes Norris Charles Craft Williamson; 1916–1932	Succeeded by Daniel B. Fleming; Andrew L. Sevier
