= J. C. Seaman =

American politician (1898–1964)

Louisiana State Representative for Tensas Parish
- In office 1944–1964
- Preceded by: Joseph T. Curry
- Succeeded by: S. S. DeWitt

Personal details
- Born: Joseph Carryl Seaman; December 8, 1898 Waterproof, Tensas Parish, Louisiana, U.S.
- Died: June 14, 1964 (aged 65) Waterproof, Louisiana
- Resting place: Natchez City Cemetery; Natchez, Mississippi, U.S.
- Party: Democratic
- Spouse(s): Evie Hinton Greaves (died 1926) Edith Gooding Post (m. 1932)
- Children: 2
- Occupation: Banker; insurance agent; politician
- Seaman was politically allied with Governor Earl Kemp Long, who approved Seaman’s request for the funding of the popular Lake Bruin State Park in Tensas Parish.

Joseph Carryl Seaman Sr., known as J.C. Seaman (December 8, 1898 – June 14, 1964), was a five-term member of the Louisiana House of Representatives from Waterproof in Tensas Parish in northeast Louisiana, having served from 1944 to 1964.

== Early life ==
Joseph Carryl Seaman graduated from Waterproof High School. His brother William M. Seaman was a sheriff in Tensas Parish, Louisiana.

== Career ==
Seaman worked as a banker starting in 1918. He served as Louisiana division president of the American Bankers Association.

Seaman served in the Louisiana House of Representatives, representing Waterproof, Louisiana, from 1944 to 1964. During his tenure, he was a member of the judiciary (committee B), bankers and banking, appropriations, and ways and means committees. He served as a member of the Waterproof town council for 20 years. He was a member of the Tensas library board. He formed an insurance business in 1938 in Waterproof.

== Personal life ==
Seaman married Edith Post, daughter of W. W. Post. His two sons were Joseph Carryl Jr. and Colin D. He was a member of the Episcopal Church.

Seaman died on June 14, 1964, at his home in Waterproof. He was buried at Natchez City Cemetery in Natchez, Mississippi.

Preceded by Joseph T. Curry	Louisiana State Representative from Tensas Parish Joseph Carryl Seaman Sr. 1944–1964	Succeeded by S. S. DeWitt
