= The Madison Journal =

Weekly newspaper in Tallulah, Louisiana

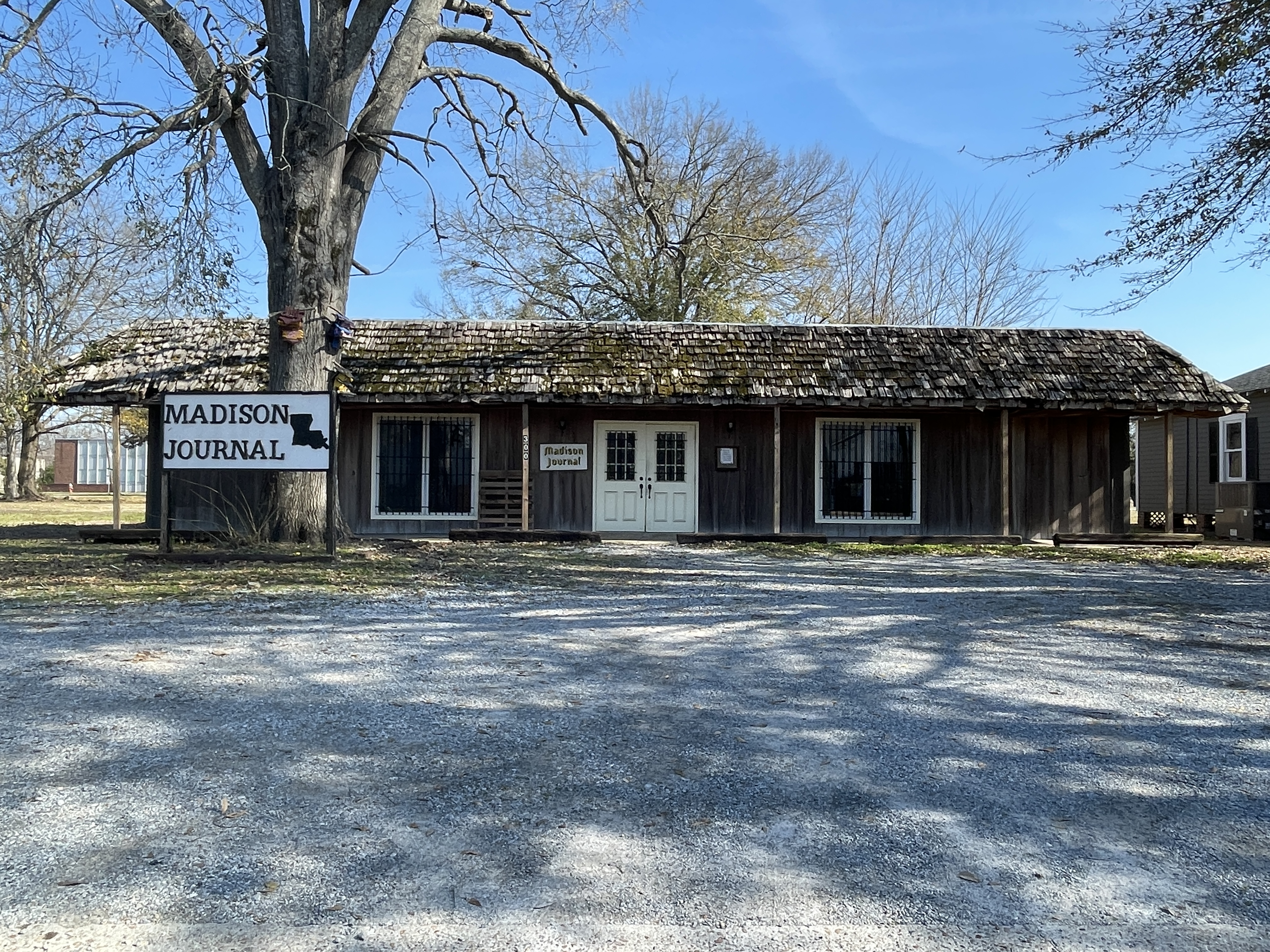
- Type: Weekly newspaper
- Publisher: Timothy Holdiness
- Language: English
- Headquarters: Tallulah, Louisiana

The Madison Journal is a weekly newspaper published in Tallulah, Louisiana, serving Madison Parish. It has been in print since the late nineteenth century.

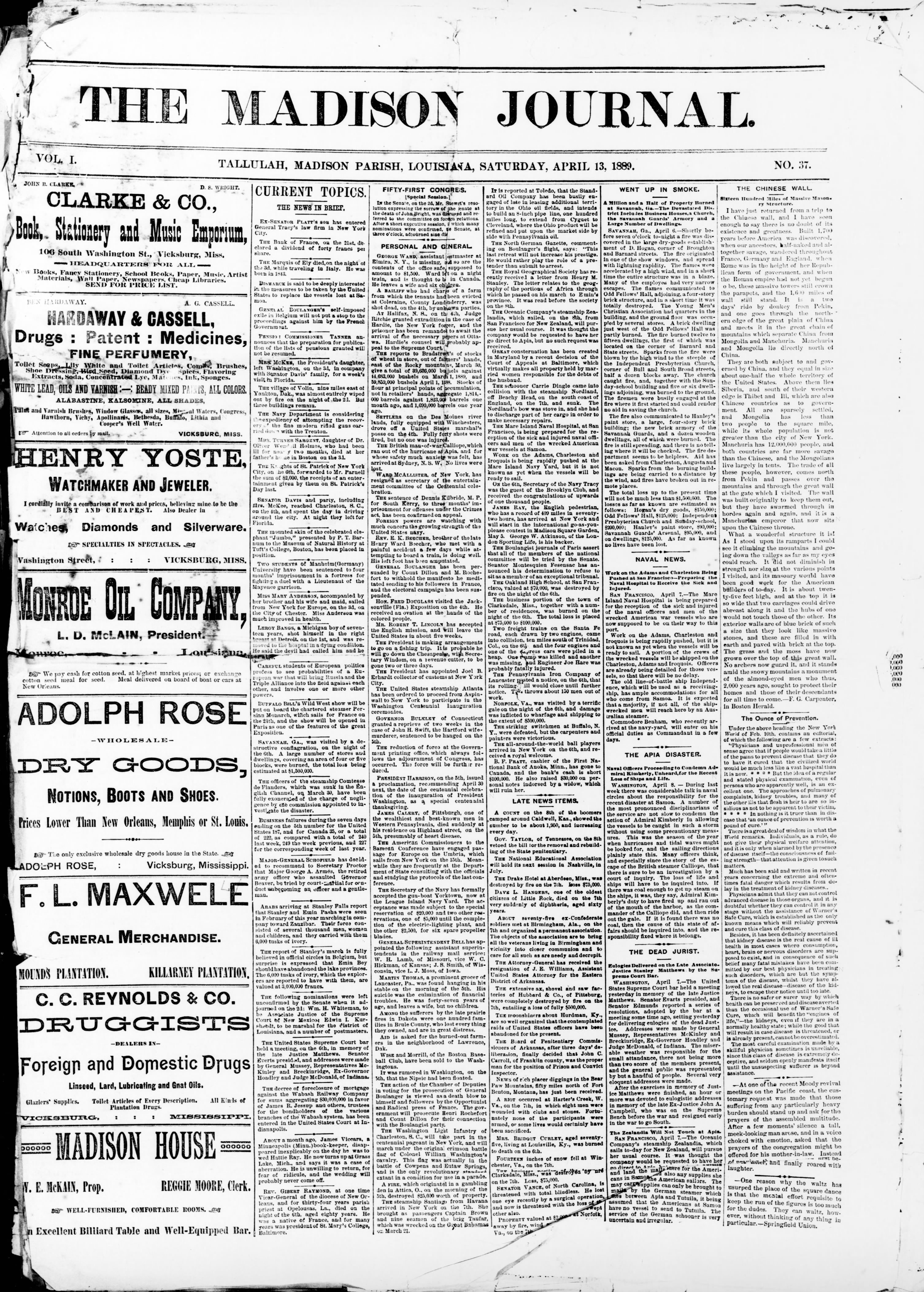
April 13, 1889 issue of The Madison Journal, published in Tallulah, Madison Parish, Louisiana.

== Notable people ==
- Jefferson B. Snyder — publisher (1888–1891).
