= Jefferson B. Snyder =

American politician (1859–1951)

Louisiana State Representative for Madison Parish
- In office 1892–1893
- Preceded by: G. M. Bedford; J. G. Hawks
- Succeeded by: W. T. King

District Attorney of the 6th Judicial District
- In office December 1904 – 1948
- Succeeded by: Thompson L. Clarke

Personal details
- Born: January 19, 1859 St. Joseph, Tensas Parish; Louisiana
- Died: October 18, 1951 (aged 92) Vicksburg, Warren County; Mississippi
- Cause of death: Lengthy illness
- Resting place: Silver Cross Cemetery in Tallulah, Louisiana
- Party: Democratic
- Spouse: Never married
- Relations: Robert H. Snyder
- Education: Tulane University Law School
- Occupation: Lawyer; District attorney

Jefferson B. Snyder (January 19, 1859 – October 18, 1951), was a lawyer and politician from the Mississippi River delta country of northeastern Louisiana. Snyder became a virtual political boss of Madison, Tensas, and East Carroll parishes; his leadership was rarely challenged, and politicians courted his endorsements.

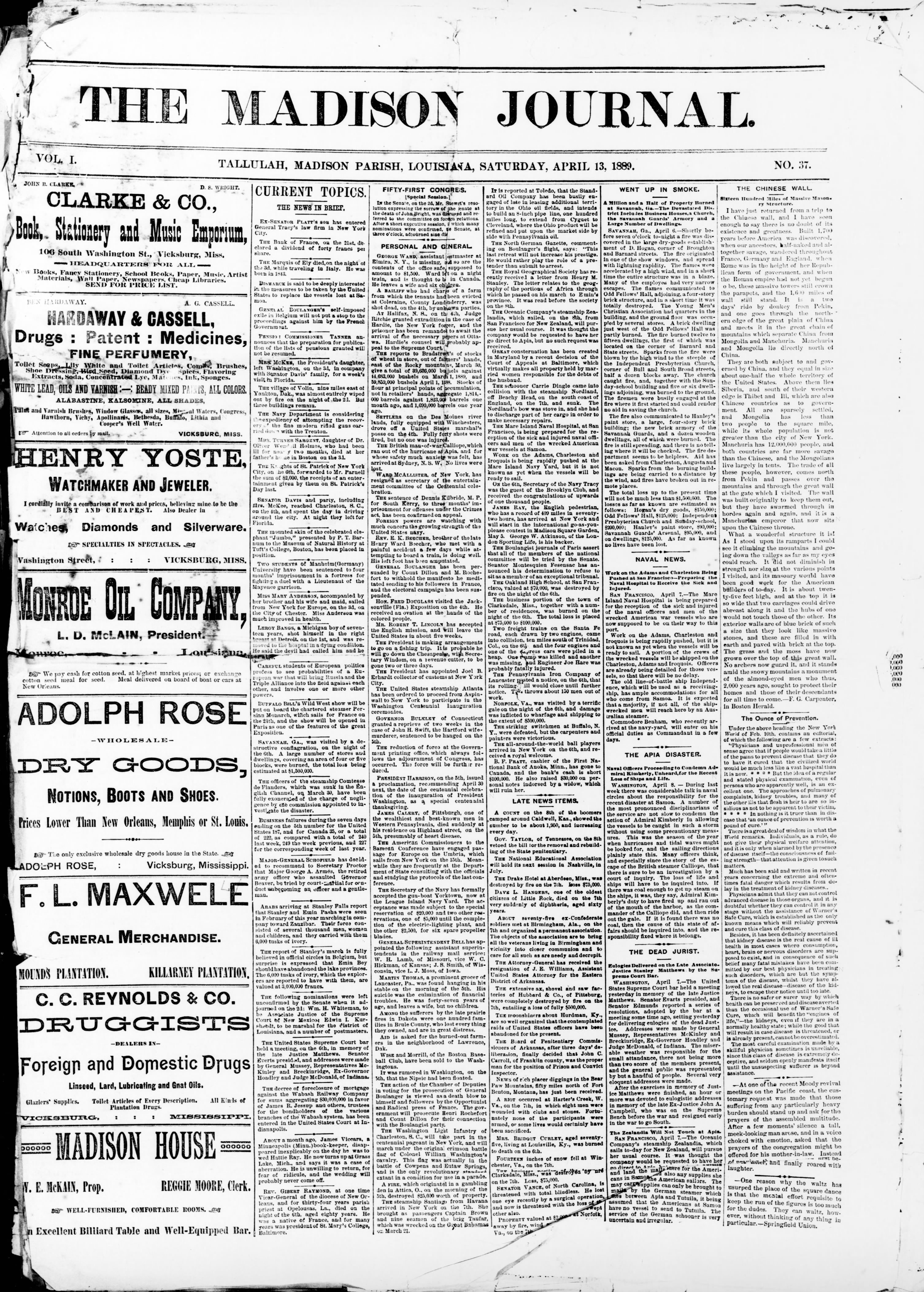
April 13, 1889 issue of The Madison Journal, published in Tallulah, Madison Parish, Louisiana.

== Background ==
Snyder and his older brother, Robert H. Snyder, were born in St. Joseph, the Tensas Parish seat of government. Robert "Bob" Snyder served as Lieutenant Governor of Louisiana from 1896 to 1900 and as Speaker of the Louisiana House of Representatives from 1904 until his death in office late in 1905. Though Bob Snyder had early formal education and attained higher office in a shorter life span than his younger brother, Jeff Snyder, was a political figure for more than forty-five years. Largely self-educated, he worked in his younger years as a toll collector at a bridge, as a clerk in a store, and as a Tensas Parish deputy sheriff.

In 1879, Snyder was part of a posse that chased the Jesse James gang, whose members robbed two stores in far western Mississippi, at Washington in Adams County and Fayette in Jefferson County. The gang absconded with $2,000 cash in the second robbery and took shelter in abandoned cabins on the Kemp Plantation south of St. Joseph. With deputy Snyder included, the posse attacked and killed two of the outlaws but failed to capture the entire gang. Jesse James would live another three years until his demise in, coincidentally, another St. Joseph in northwestern Missouri.

== Early career ==
Several years after the end of Reconstruction, Snyder relocated forty miles north to Tallulah, the seat of government in Madison Parish. He served on the powerful Fifth District Levee Board, particularly important to his area because of periodic river flooding, the worst in his lifetime having been in 1927.

From 1888 to 1891, Snyder revived the parish newspaper, The Madison Journal, which had ceased publication in 1883. He was the publisher for three years.

From 1892 to 1893, he was a member of the Louisiana House of Representatives for Madison Parish. He resigned from the legislature a year into his term to become a United States Navy officer in the customhouse in New Orleans. The appointment came during the second administration of U.S. President Grover Cleveland through the intervention of U.S. Representative Charles J. Boatner of Louisiana's 5th congressional district. While in New Orleans, Snyder obtained a law degree from Tulane University Law School. He also supported his widowed mother and a sister, Kate, later Kate Watson, who moved with him to New Orleans. Snyder may have remained in New Orleans beyond 1897 had not his position been ended with the arrival of the Republican President William McKinley.

== Settling in Tallulah ==
Snyder returned to Tallulah and was a delegate to both the 1898 and the 1921 state constitutional conventions held in Baton Rouge. In the 1921 convention he was the first vice president. From 1904 until 1948, he was the district attorney for the 6th Judicial District based in Madison Parish. Frank Voelker Sr., of Lake Providence in East Carroll Parish, like Snyder another supporter of the planter interests, served from 1936 until his death in 1963 as a judge on that same court.

In May 1923, Snyder spoke before a rally at the courthouse in St. Joseph assembled in defense of the revival of the Ku Klux Klan. After Snyder's remarks, the Reverend William McDougall of Winnsboro, hailed the KKK for its "principles of Christianity and Americanism." Oliver Watson, a candidate for clerk of court, took to the stage to denounce the Klan as divisive and unnecessary because of the restraint long exercised in race relations within Tensas Parish. Watson was subsequently defeated in the election, a point not lost on the observant Snyder.

== Relationship with Huey Long ==
In 1927, Snyder stunned his associates when he endorsed Huey P. Long Jr., for governor in the 1928 primary race against U.S. Representative Riley J. Wilson, the favorite of the planter interests, and the third candidate, sitting Governor Oramel H. Simpson. The decision was surprising because Snyder had enjoyed a close relationship in the past with Long's most vehement critic, former Governor Jared Y. Sanders Sr. Snyder backed Long because he believed that Long, who had lost the 1924 primary race, would defeat Wilson, and Snyder wanted a good relationship with the new governor over whom he expected to exert much influence on behalf of delta interests. He tried unsuccessfully to get Long to visit his hunting lodge on Lake Bruin. The Tensas Gazette questioned Snyder's backing of Long because the district attorney had for "practically his whole life-time been hand in glove with the New Orleans Ring". When Snyder turned aside his old friend Sanders, the Tensas Gazette said that the DA had "turned to other gods" and now worshipped at "another shrine." After the defection, Sanders wrote Snyder that the Great Mississippi Flood of 1927 had not only devastated delta lands but also "affected your mind."

By the spring of 1930, Snyder expressed regret for his support of Long, who he believed had agitated class warfare and undermined the state constitution which Snyder had helped to write. Long shut out most delta interests in his administration. Again showing his political flexibility, Long vowed to "do all in my power to make amends for that course". Long, however, was on another roll; soon he would unseat U.S. Senator Joseph E. Ransdell of Lake Providence, the highest ranking of all delta political advocates. That action left the anti-Long advocates in a sense of bewilderment. Many tried to make peace with the Long forces to survive politically.

== Delayed retirement ==
Snyder could have retired with full pay on his 80th birthday by virtue of his more than 30 years service as a district attorney. The retirement was permissible through a state constitutional amendment pushed by Governor Richard Leche and approved by voters in 1937. The amendment was humorously called the "Amendment for the Retirement of Jeff B. Snyder" in honor of the long-serving district attorney, held in such esteem that he was usually called "Judge Snyder" though he was never a judge. However, Snyder continued to serve as DA until 1948; he postponed retirement by nine years under the constitutional amendment approved for his benefit.

== Political insider ==
Snyder was active in the Louisiana Democratic State Central Committee. He was a delegate to both the 1916 and 1924 Democratic National Conventions, which nominated Woodrow Wilson for a second term and John W. Davis, respectively, the latter to run against Calvin Coolidge.

For many years, Snyder maintained a hunting lodge on Lake Bruin near St. Joseph, where he hosted guests, all men, ranging from the governor to a U.S. senator, an architect, a surgeon, a publisher, the local bootlegger, and African Americans of various occupations. Snyder was known as one of the most skilled raconteurs—his orations could leave his guests spellbound. Guests included the Kentucky humorist Irvin S. Cobb and the journalist Bob Davis, the columnist who penned "Bob Davis Recalls" for the Joseph Pulitzer newspaper chain.

On April 6, 1943, Snyder attended the Tensas Parish centennial ceremony held in St. Joseph, where he and Sheriff Elliot D. Coleman were among the most acclaimed speakers. Snyder, then eight-four, recalled with nostalgia the time when there were "no levees, no bridges, ferries nor roads, but the richest soil in the world, more fertile than the Valley of the Nile River. It was a hunter's paradise."

== Death ==
Snyder died at ninety-one of a lingering illness in a hospital in Vicksburg, Mississippi. His body lay in state in the Madison Parish Courthouse, with funeral in the Trinity Episcopal Church in Tallulah. He is interred at Silver Cross Cemetery in Tallulah.

The list of honorary pallbearers reads like a "Who's Who" of state and delta politicians: Russell B. Long, Allen J. Ellender, John B. Fournet, Otto Passman, Benjamin C. Dawkins Sr., Joseph E. Ransdell, W. W. Burnside, Joseph T. Curry, Andrew L. Sevier, Judge Frank Voelker Sr., and successor District Attorney Thompson L. Clarke of Snyder's native St. Joseph.

Political offices
Preceded by G. M. Bedford; J. G. Hawks	Louisiana State Representative for Madison Parish; 1892–1893	Succeeded by W. T. King
