= Tensas State Bank hostage crisis =

2013 hostage taking and shooting incident in Louisiana, United States

- Location: St. Joseph, Louisiana, United States
- Date: August 13, 2013
- Attack type: Shooting, hostage crisis
- Weapons: Handgun; AK-47 rifle
- Deaths: 3 (including the perpetrator)
- Perpetrator: Fuaed Abdo Ahmed
- Motive: Schizophrenia

On August 13, 2013, a gunman, identified as 20-year-old Fuaed Abdo Ahmed, took two women and a man hostage at the Tensas State Bank in St. Joseph, Louisiana. He killed two of the hostages after releasing the third. A subsequent police investigation officially concluded that Ahmed suffered from mental health issues and acted alone, while the incident was not classified as an act of terrorism.

== Details ==
On August 13, 2013, Ahmed entered the St. Joseph branch of Tensas State Bank, armed with both a handgun and an AK-47 rifle. His duffel bag was packed with items that he planned to use to torture his hostages. He held three people hostage: Charles Henry "Jay" Warbington, Jr., of Wisner in Franklin Parish, Tamara LaDean "Deannie" McDaniel, and Patricia White. All three were employees at the bank for more than twenty years. During negotiations, state police superintendent, Colonel Mike Edmonson, located a friend of Ahmed's in Alaska, who talked him into releasing one of the hostages, Patricia White. According to Edmondson, Ahmed was "mad at people that he said were mean to him. He had voices in his head." Authorities said that Ahmed believed the family of his ex-girlfriend in Lake Providence had caused their breakup and had placed a "microphone device" of some kind in his head.

Eventually, Ahmed shot the remaining two hostages. Warbington died at the scene, while McDaniel was critically wounded and died two days later at Rapides Regional Medical Center in Alexandria. Soon afterward, the Louisiana State Police broke into the bank and fatally shot Ahmed. It did not appear that Ahmed knew the hostages, but the hostages recognized him.

== Perpetrator ==
Fuaed Abdo Ahmed (c. 1993 – August 13, 2013) was identified as the hostage-taker and shooter. His family owned a Trak service station located across the street from the bank. His parents were from Yemen. According to Ahmed on Facebook, he was born in Fresno, California and was Muslim.

Ahmed had been a football player at the private Briarfield Academy, located in Lake Providence in East Carroll Parish in far northeastern Louisiana. His coach, Ben Durham, said that Ahmed had 2,700 rushing yards and 40 touchdowns in his senior year. Durham described Ahmed as never displaying aggressive behavior when playing football, "He was a normal good kid. It's not like he ever had any fits of rage. Ever." Sometime later, Durham said that he had a Facebook conversation with Ahmed and noticed the emergence of his paranoid tendencies.

=== FBI encounter in April 2013 ===
On August 23, 2013, it was disclosed that the Federal Bureau of Investigation had interviewed Ahmed in April while he was visiting in Yemen; his family reported him missing or possibly kidnapped. Ahmed told the agents that he had not been kidnapped and was hearing voices in his head and at times felt suicidal but claimed he would not injure others. Ahmed was also interviewed in June by the Department of Homeland Security in Los Angeles, when he returned to the United States from Yemen. Agents asked him about a Facebook photo posted of himself holding an AK-47 rifle in Yemen. During this interview, DHS said that Ahmed denied any criminal activity or inclination toward terrorism. Authorities in Los Angeles conducted their own evaluation of Ahmed and placed him a medical facility for several days of mental evaluation.

=== Mental health problems ===
On March 12, 2014, state police confirmed after a months-long investigation that Ahmed had been treated at a California hospital several weeks prior to the shooting for paranoid schizophrenia. His brother, Yasser, told police that Ahmed had employed yoga for six hours a day in a vain attempt to "cure himself", rather than taking medication prescribed by doctors. Police found in Ahmed's room a bottle of Risperidone, a drug used to treat schizophrenia; only three of the sixty pills were missing. Yasser confirmed too that Ahmed had used narcotics and bath salts before he left Louisiana State University in Baton Rouge, where he had been a short-term student.

An investigation found that the four-member SWAT team that breached the bank fired a total of twelve shots and struck Ahmed eight times, finding the police actions justifiable. In a letter found inside the vehicle that he drove to the bank, Ahmed claimed to have ended his ties to Islam, his family, and Middle Eastern culture and heritage. Instead, he extolled his American citizenship and said that he had become a "born again Christian". Even with those claims, Ahmed contradicted himself when he wrote in the letter, seen by officials as a last will and testament, that neither whites nor non-Muslims could attend his funeral.

== Aftermath ==
Some 300 St. Joseph residents came together on the evening of August 20 to commemorate the victims. Ronny McDaniel, the husband of Tamara McDaniel, told the gathering that he is relying on his faith, saying, "I know in my heart it was meant to be. It was God's will to take them home. If they could come back right now, they wouldn't come back. I just believe they're in a better place."

Robby White, husband of Patricia White, the hostage who was released, explained the loss to the community:

This tragedy wasn't on the scale of 9/11, but it had the same effect on this community. There's no way to describe the feelings that each of us felt when we discovered the situation had turned so very wrong. We became stunned, shocked and so damn angry.

Colonel Edmonson addressed the gathering and announced a thorough investigation would be undertaken to determine why Ahmed attacked the bank and its employees. Edmonson said that a final report since released would attempt to reveal Ahmed's state of mind to help perhaps prevent future attacks of this kind.
