= Robert H. Snyder =

American politician (1855–1905)

23rd Lieutenant Governor of Louisiana
- In office 1896–1900
- Governor: Murphy J. Foster
- Preceded by: Hiram R. Lott
- Succeeded by: Albert Estopinal, Sr.

Louisiana State Representative from Tensas Parish
- In office 1890–1896
- Preceded by: R. C. McCullough
- Succeeded by: A. E. Newton

Louisiana State Representative from Tensas Parish
- In office 1904–1905
- Preceded by: A. E. Newton; Thomas M. Wade
- Succeeded by: Samuel W. Martien

Speaker of the Louisiana House of Representatives
- In office 1904–1905
- Preceded by: Jared Y. Sanders, Sr.
- Succeeded by: Joseph W. Hyams

Personal details
- Born: July 13, 1855
- Died: November 17, 1905 (aged 50)
- Resting place: Natchez City Cemetery in Natchez, Mississippi
- Party: Democratic Party
- Spouse: Ella Carson Snyder
- Relations: Jefferson B. Snyder (brother)

Robert H. Snyder (July 13, 1855 – November 17, 1905) was a Democratic politician from Tensas Parish, Louisiana.

Snyder served in the Louisiana House of Representatives for two nonconsecutive terms from 1890 to 1896 and from 1904 until his death in office.

From 1896 to 1900, Snyder was lieutenant governor under Governor Murphy J. Foster, Sr., a favorite of the planter class. During this time, the Louisiana Constitutional Convention of 1898 was held. Snyder was defeated for lieutenant governor in 1900 by future U.S. Representative Albert Estopinal, Sr., of St. Bernard Parish.

Snyder's younger brother, Jefferson B. Snyder, was a native of Tensas Parish and district attorney from 1904 to 1945 in Tallulah in Madison Parish.

Snyder is interred at Natchez City Cemetery in Natchez, Mississippi.

Political offices
Preceded by Hiram R. Lott	Lieutenant Governor of Louisiana; Robert H. Snyder; 1896–1900	Succeeded by Albert Estopinal, Sr.
Preceded by R. C. McCullough	Louisiana State Representative from Tensas Parish; Robert H. Snyder; 1890–1896	Succeeded by A. E. Newton
Preceded by Two members: A. E. Newton Thomas W. Wade	Louisiana State Representative from Tensas Parish; Robert H. Snyder; 1904–1906	Succeeded by Samuel W. Martien
Preceded by Jared Y. Sanders, Sr., of St. Mary Parish	Speaker of the Louisiana House of Representatives from Tensas Parish; Robert H. Snyder; 1904–1906	Succeeded by Joseph W. Hyams of West Baton Rouge Parish
