= Tensas Parish School Board =

School board in Louisiana, United States

Coordinates: 31.9209°N 91.2363°W

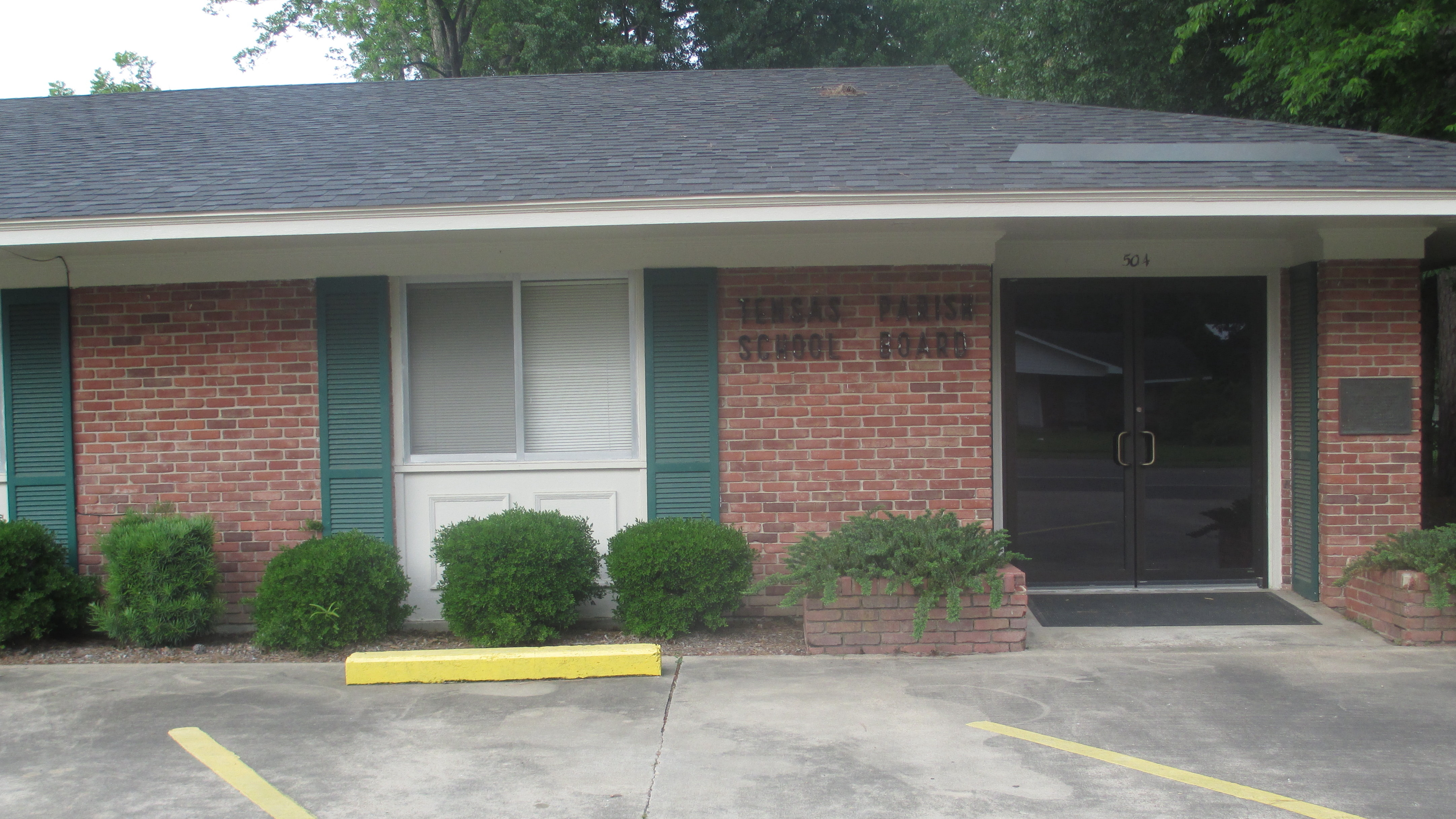
The Tensas Parish School Board operates from this office at 720 Plank Road in St. Joseph, Louisiana.

The Tensas Parish School Board is an entity responsible for the operation of public schools in Tensas Parish in northeastern Louisiana, United States.

== Schools ==
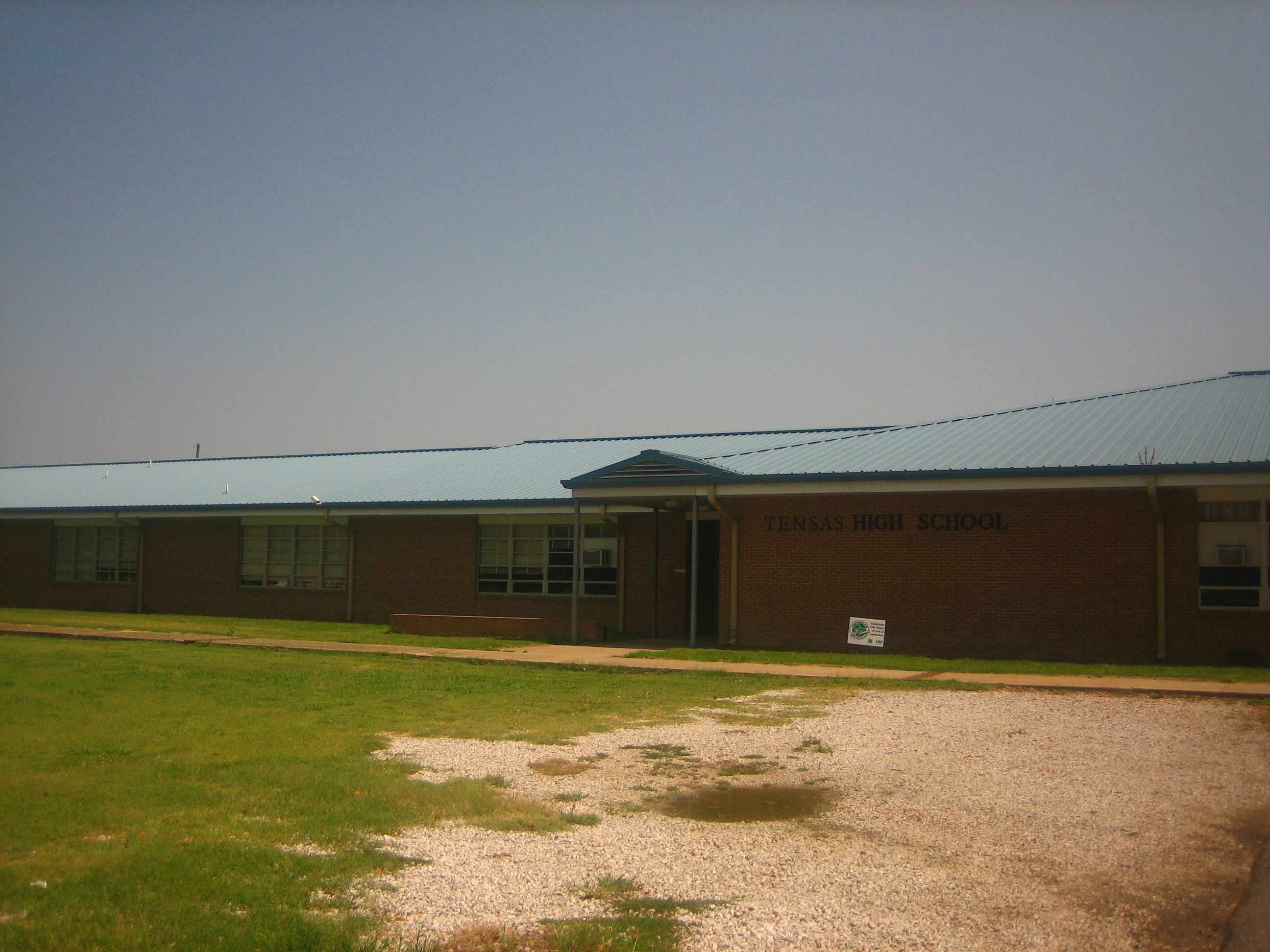
Tensas High School

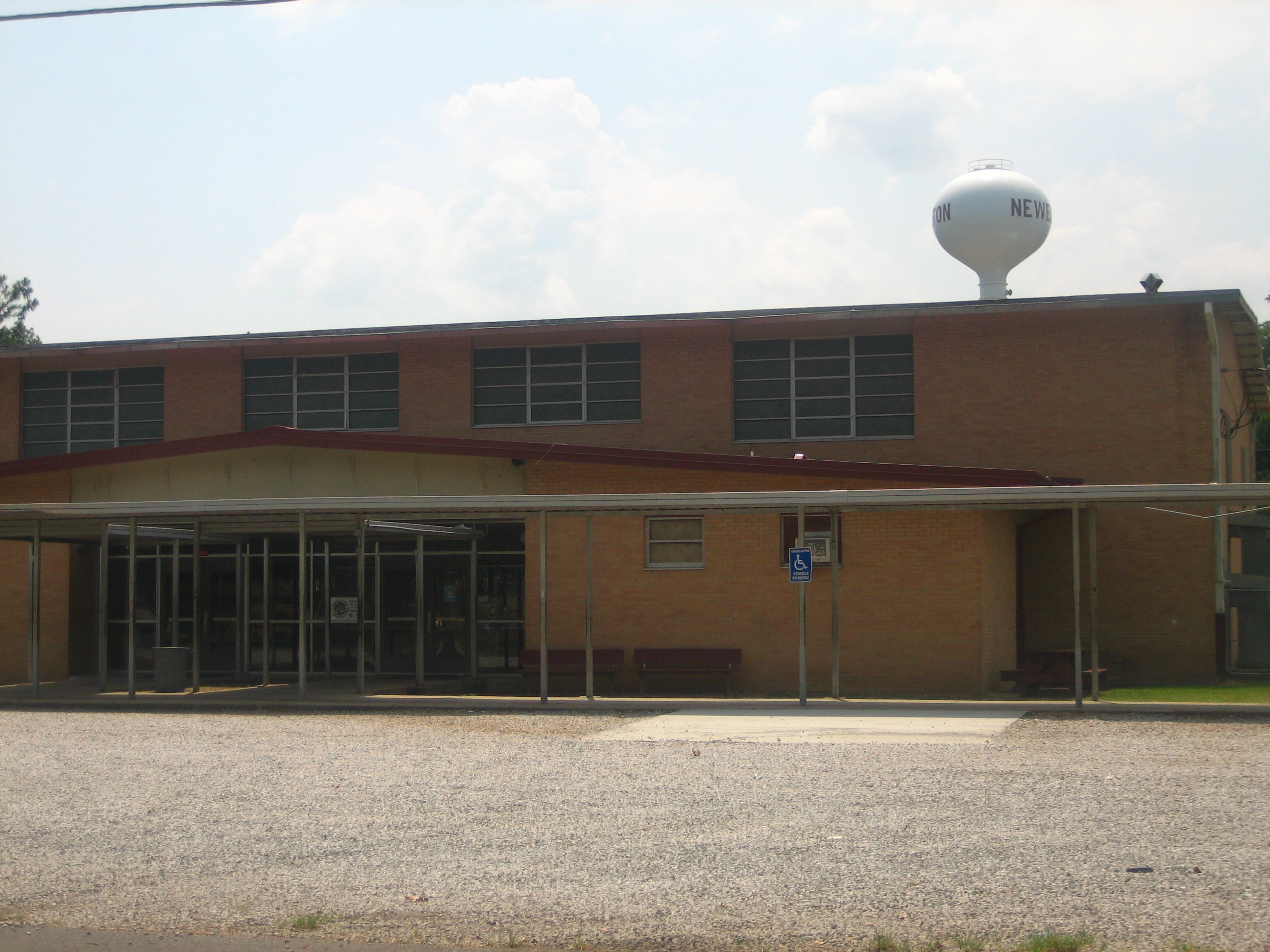
Newellton Elementary School

- Grades 7-12
  - Tensas High School (St. Joseph)
- Grades PK-8
  - Newellton Elementary School (Newellton)
- Grades PK-6
  - Tensas Elementary School (St. Joseph)

== Demographics ==
- Total Students (as of October 1, 2007): 768
- Gender
  - Male: 54%
  - Female: 46%
- Race/Ethnicity
  - African American: 91.54%
  - White: 6.64%
  - Hispanic: 1.82%
- Socio-Economic Indicators
  - At-Risk: 90.10%
  - Free Lunch: 84.77%
  - Reduced Lunch: 5.34%

== See also ==
- List of school districts in Louisiana
