= Lake Bruin State Park =

State park in Louisiana, United States

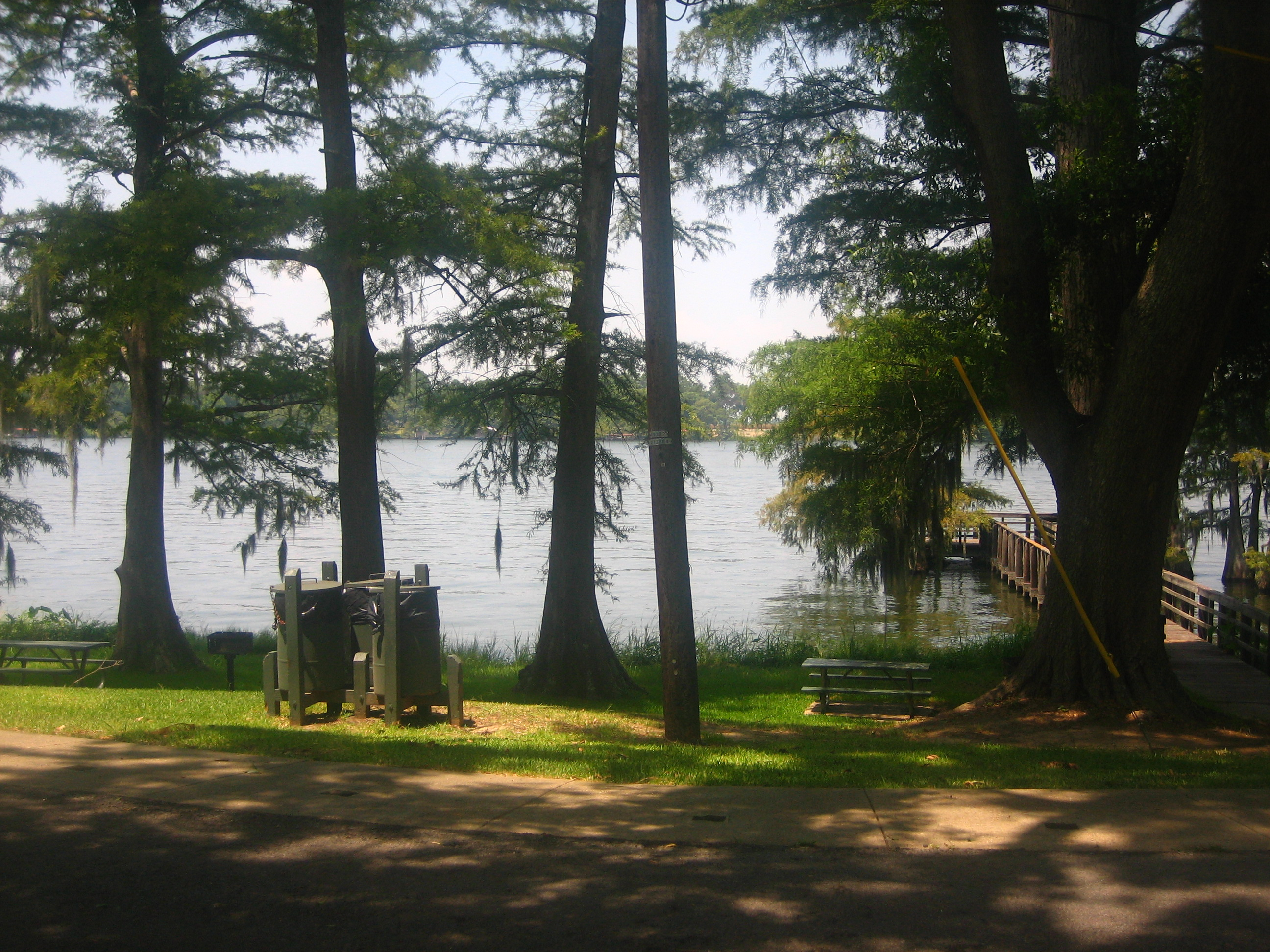
- Picnic tables and fishing pier at Lake Bruin State Park

- Location within Louisiana Location within the United States
- Location: Tensas Parish, Louisiana, USA
- Nearest city: St. Joseph, Louisiana
- Coordinates: 31°57′30″N 91°12′02″W
- Area: 53 acres (21 ha)
- Established: 1956
- Visitors: 41,545 (in 2022)

Lake Bruin State Park is a state park in Louisiana located on the shore of Lake Bruin, an oxbow lake near the town of St. Joseph in Tensas Parish.

== History ==
Lake Bruin was originally part of the Mississippi River before it changed its course. The lake gets its name from Peter Bryan Bruin who owned a plantation next to the lake. During the 1920s, the lake and the area around it was sold to the state by the Debusant family.

The park itself was initially a fish hatchery operated by the Department of Wildlife and Fisheries from 1928 until 1956. The fish hatchery had not been used for about 15 years when it was added to the State Parks System as Lake Bruin Wayside Park, the name was later changed to just Lake Bruin State Park.

Improvements began February 1, 1957, and including clearing, cleaning, and sodding about 40 acres of the park for "concessions and recreational purposes." Girl Scouts and Boy Scouts contributed volunteer hours to the project.

== Activities and facilities ==
Activities at the park include fishing, boating, swimming, camping, and birding. The park features picnic tables, three fishing piers, a playground, a bathhouse, washrooms, boat rentals, a boat launch, rentable cabins, and campsites with electricity and running water.

== Ecology ==
The park is home to many species of birds, including Red-bellied woodpecker, Wood duck, Pied-billed grebe, American coot, Swamp sparrow, and Belted kingfisher. Lake Bruin features largemouth bass, white crappie, bluegill, longear sunfish, and redspotted sunfish. Baldcypress is the major tree in the park.
