= Daniel F. Ashford =

American politician (1879–1929)

Daniel Fowler Ashford

Louisiana State Representative for Tensas Parish
- In office 1916 – July 17, 1929
- Preceded by: John Murdock
- Succeeded by: Joseph T. Curry

Personal details
- Born: November 29, 1879 Rose Hill Plantation, Mississippi, US
- Died: July 17, 1929 (aged 49)
- Party: Democratic
- Spouse: Margaret "Maggie" Moore Ashford (marriage ended 1912, her death)
- Children: 3
- Occupation: Cotton planter

Daniel Fowler Ashford (November 29, 1879 – July 17, 1929) was a cotton planter from St. Joseph in Tensas Parish in northeastern Louisiana, who served from 1916 until his death in office as a Democrat in the Louisiana House of Representatives.

== Biography ==
Ashford was the son of Daniel F. Ashford, M.D., who attended Yale University in New Haven, Connecticut. In 1895, Ashford came to Tensas Parish to manage a plantation for Eli Tullis. He received plantation property thereafter as a wedding gift from his father-in-law, Joseph Moore. Ashford was a stockholder in the Panola Company, an agricultural firm for which Ashford's House successor, Joseph T. Curry of St. Joseph, was the secretary-treasurer. Ashford owned a stable of racing horses and was active in the sportsmen's group, the Cooter Point Club on the Tensas River. Known for his immaculate dress and refined manners, Ashford spent lavishly on himself and his daughters. He is believed to have been the first resident of Tensas Parish to own an automobile and a wristwatch.

Ashford and his wife, the former Margaret "Maggie" Moore (born September 30, 1878), had three daughters, Marie Louise (born 1903), Edith (born 1908), and Margaret Moore (born December 21, 1911). Mrs. Ashford died in Natchez, Mississippi, of acute cardiac arrest on February 27, 1912, at the age of thirty-three, just two months after Margaret's birth.

Like most of the Tensas Parish planters, Ashford was a member of the Episcopal Church.

Ashford died at the age of forty-nine. In a special election, Joseph T. Curry was elected to succeed Ashford in the House. Curry served from 1930 until 1944.

Political offices
Preceded by John Murdock	Louisiana State Representative for Tensas Parish; Daniel Fowler Ashford; 1916–1929	Succeeded by Joseph T. Curry
