= St. Joseph, Louisiana =

- Town
- Town of Saint Joseph
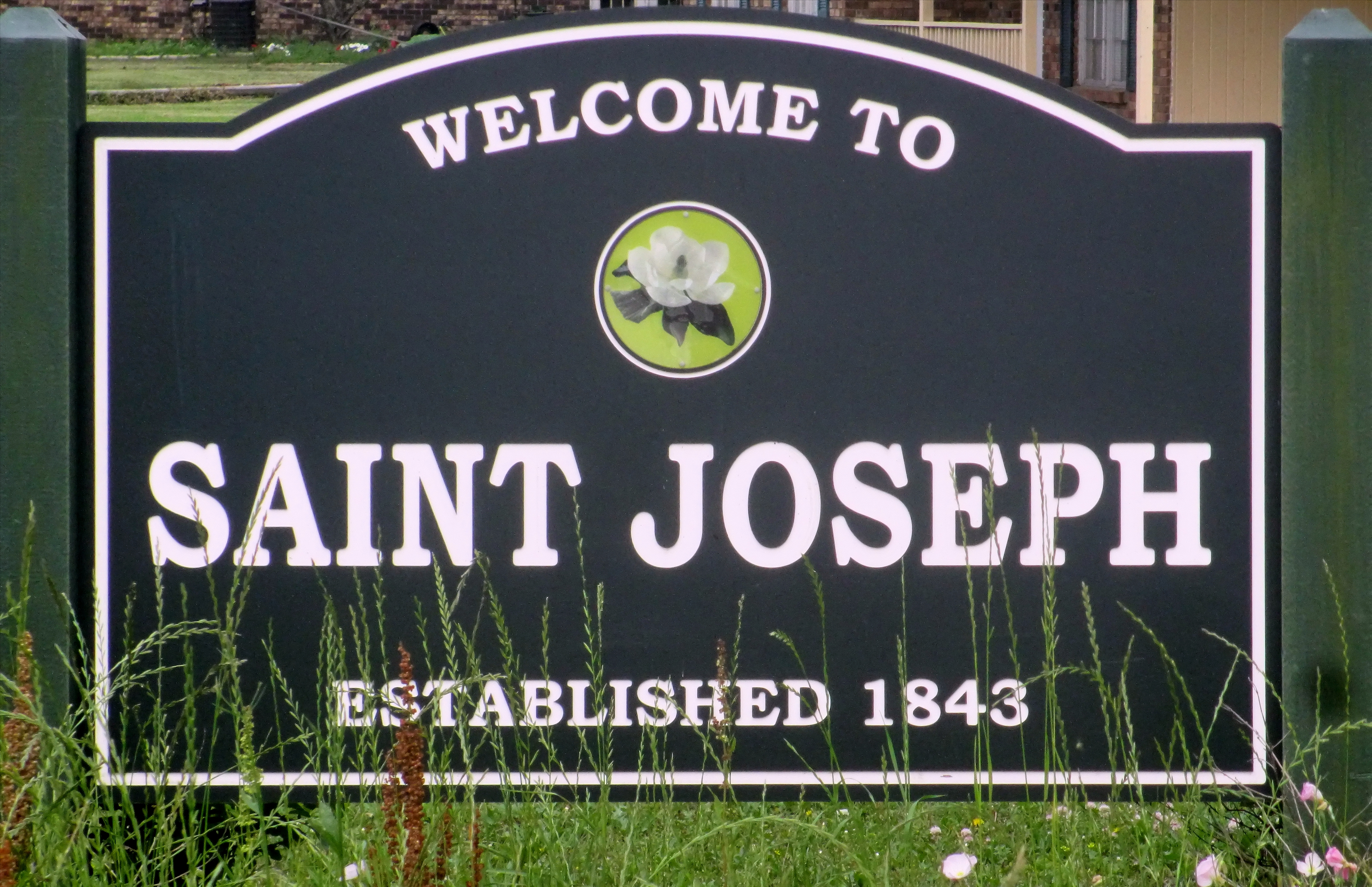

- Location of St. Joseph in Tensas Parish, Louisiana.

- Location of Louisiana in the United States
- Coordinates: 31°55′07″N 91°14′18″W
- Country: United States
- State: Louisiana
- Parish: Tensas

Area
  - Total: 0.89 sq mi (2.31 km^{2})
  - Land: 0.89 sq mi (2.31 km^{2})
  - Water: 0 sq mi (0.00 km^{2})
- Elevation: 75 ft (23 m)

Population (2020)
  - Total: 831
  - Density: 933.3/sq mi (360.36/km^{2})
- Time zone: UTC-6 (CST)
  - Summer (DST): UTC-5 (CDT)
- ZIP code: 71366
- Area code: 318
- FIPS code: 22-67495
- GNIS feature ID: 2407270
- Website: www.stjoela.com

St. Joseph is a town in, and the parish seat of, rural Tensas Parish in northeastern Louisiana, United States, in the delta of the Mississippi River. As of the 2020 census, St. Joseph had a population of 831. The town had an African-American majority of 77.4 percent in 2010.

== History ==
The first store at what became St. Joseph was established around 1813 at what was then called John Densmore's Landing. Unique for the Deep South, St. Joseph was planned and developed in 1843 by European-American settlers around a New England–style village green. The downtown area along Plank Road is listed on the National Register of Historic Places. The area around the town was developed for cotton plantations.

From 1862 to 1865, Louisiana was part of the Confederacy's Trans-Mississippi Department, and St. Joseph operated as a landing for a major route across the Mississippi River. According to the historian John D. Winters in his The Civil War in Louisiana, "Such a strong force of Confederate cavalry occupied the Mississippi side opposite St. Joseph that all Federal attempts to close the transit in January [1865] ended in failure."

In 1879, the Jesse James gang robbed two stores in far western Mississippi, at Washington and Fayette. The gang absconded with $2,000 cash in the second robbery, crossed the river, and took shelter in abandoned cabins on the Kemp Plantation south of St. Joseph. A posse caught up with them, attacking and killing two of the outlaws, but failed to capture the entire gang. Among the deputies was Jefferson B. Snyder, who later was a long-serving district attorney in northeastern Louisiana. Jesse James was killed three years later by one of his own gang members in St. Joseph, Missouri.

St. Joseph is the entry community to Lake Bruin State Park located on Lake Bruin, an oxbow lake of the nearby Mississippi River.

On August 13, 2013, local resident Fuaed Abdo Ahmed took two women and a man hostage at the branch of Tensas State Bank in St. Joseph, saying he wanted passage out of the country. After releasing one hostage, he shot one hostage and critically wounded a second before being fatally shot by police.

=== Political history ===
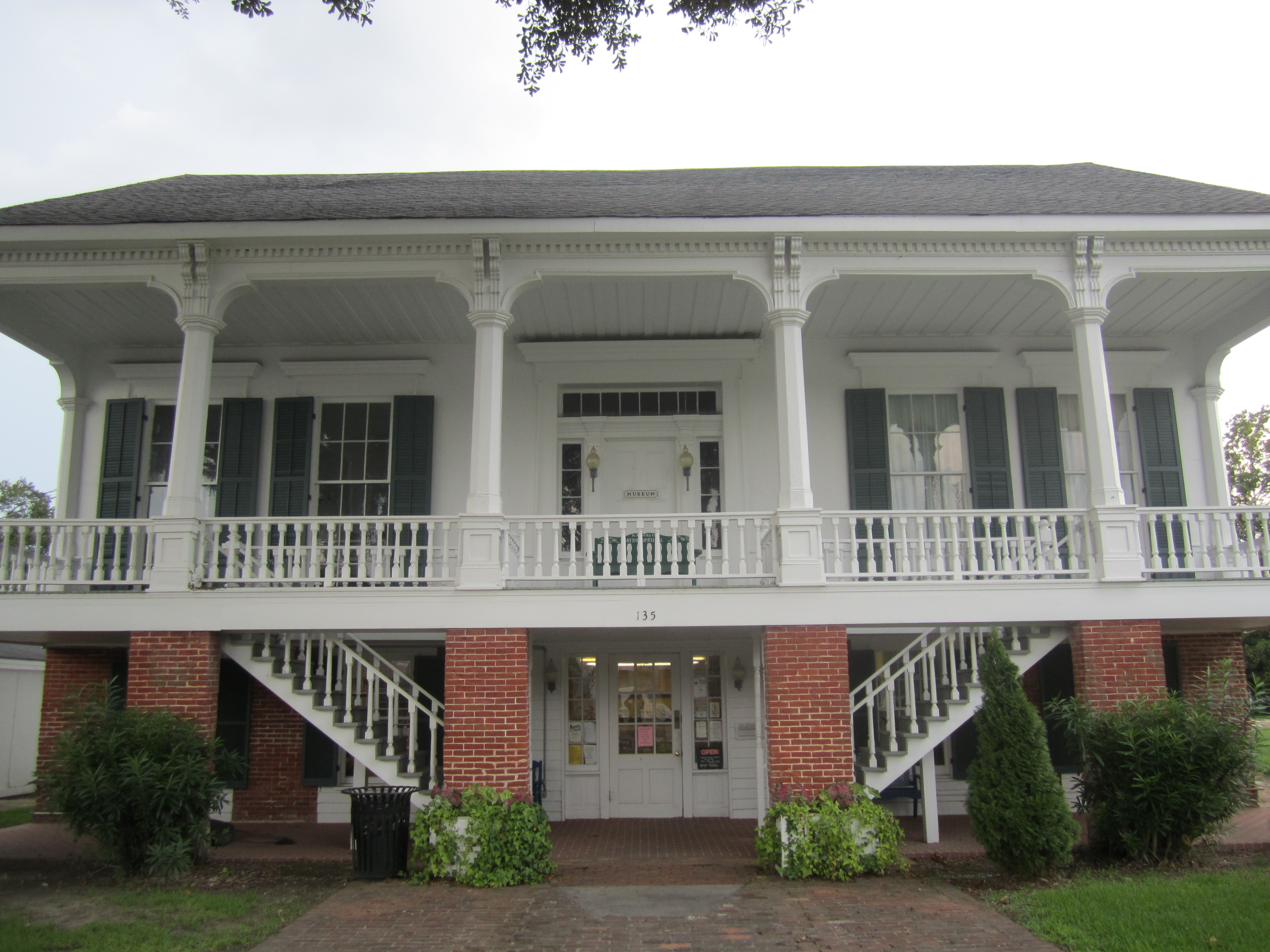
The Tensas Parish Library is housed on the ground floor of this former residence, built c. 1858 by a local merchant and partially restored in 1964. The upstairs contains the Plantation Museum.

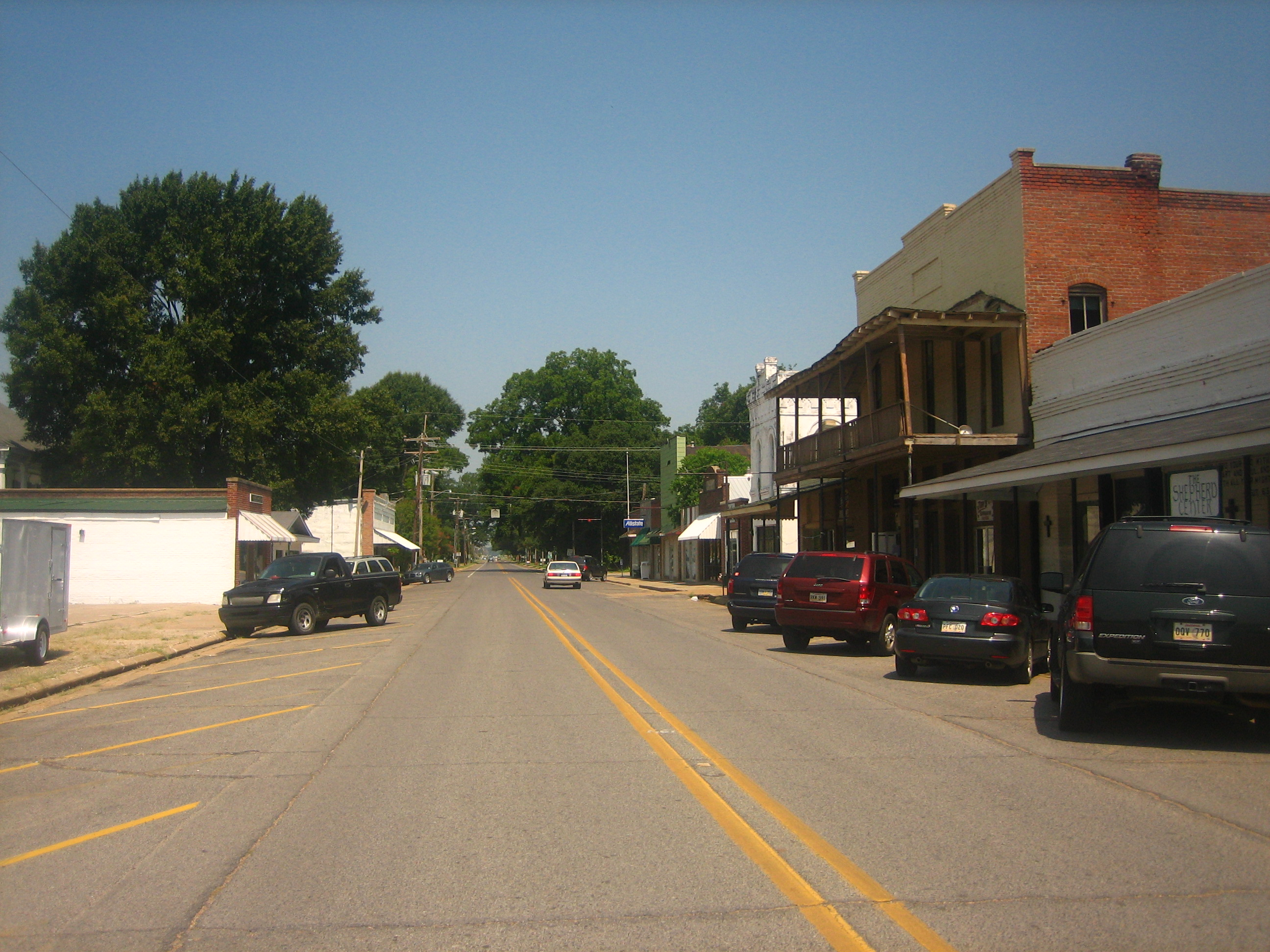
Plank Road is the main street of St. Joseph.

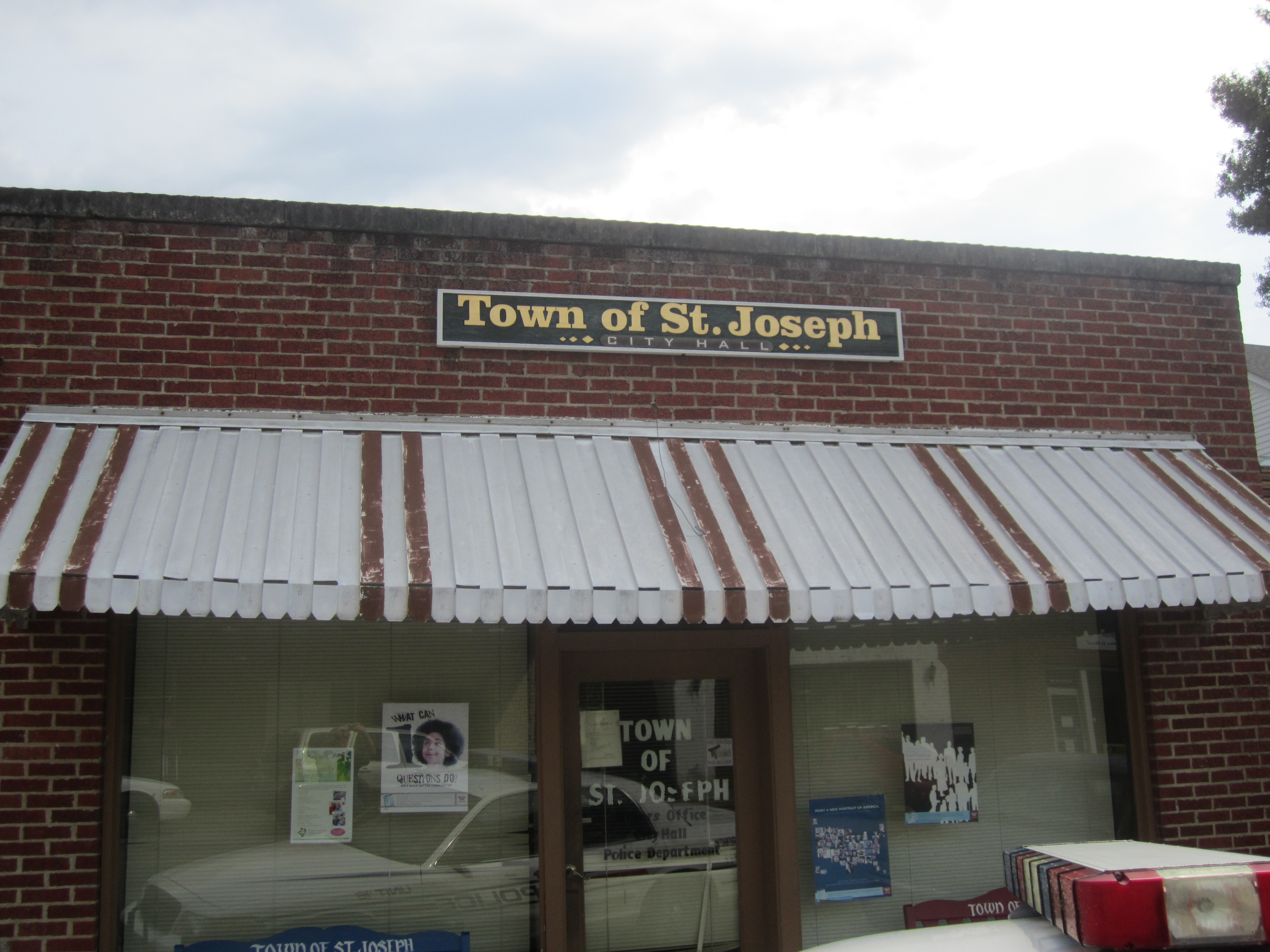
St. Joseph Town Hall

When St. Joseph was incorporated as a town in 1901, planter and businessman William Mackenzie Davidson was elected as the first mayor of St. Joseph. Absent competitive politics, given the disenfranchisement of African Americans by the state constitution in 1898, Davidson was re-elected repeatedly, holding the position until his accidental death in January 1930. Davidson was a founder and the general manager of the powerful Panola Company, an agricultural business in St. Joseph. At one point it controlled 10,000 acres of valuable farmland.

Davidson also sat on the board of the Bank of St. Joseph, of which he later became the president. He worked to bring the USDA Agricultural Experiment Station to St. Joseph and lobbied for construction of the Mississippi River bridge to connect the town to Natchez, Mississippi.

Edward L. Brown Sr. was elected in 2000 as the first African-American mayor of St. Joseph, unseating the long-term white incumbent, Whitfield Jones (February 18, 1929 – August 11, 2013) in the nonpartisan blanket primary. Brown polled 447 votes (64.9 percent) to Jones' 242 (35.1 percent).

Brown was repeatedly re-elected. In the November 6, 2012, election, Brown secured his fourth term with 384 votes (57.7 percent) over Leslie Dandridge Durham, a fellow Democrat who polled 282 votes (42.3 percent).

Prior to 1968, each parish in Louisiana, regardless of population, elected at least one member to the Louisiana House of Representatives. This method of representation resulted in under-representation of the more heavily populated and urbanized parishes. The US Supreme Court ruled on the principle that state legislatures had to establish districts with roughly equal populations, in order to support the principle of equity of "one man, one vote". It said the states had no basis for geographic representation in their legislatures. Given the rural bias and dominance in many state legislatures, many states had not accomplished redistricting since early in the 20th century, although it is to be conducted as needed after every decennial census.

The last state representative member to represent only Tensas Parish was Democrat S. S. DeWitt of Newellton and later St. Joseph. DeWitt represented Tensas Parish from 1964 to 1968. After the state legislature created districts that were roughly equal in population, DeWitt succeeded in being elected again, to serve from 1968 to 1972. He and Lantz Womack of Winnsboro together represented Franklin, Tensas, and Madison parishes. Womack defeated DeWitt in the 1971 primary. DeWitt later switched to Republican Party affiliation.

=== Water system ===
In December 2012, St. Joseph residents were placed under an advisory to boil their drinking water because of problems with the aging municipal water system. A mechanical failure at the town treatment plant caused a sudden drop in the water supply. In March 2013, a water main cracked. There are leaks at the base of the city water tower. State Senator Francis C. Thompson, whose district includes Tensas Parish, sought emergency funding for repairs to the system, which serves about seven hundred customers.

In 2016 the town had failed to obtain an approved town audit for the financial year ending 2015, needed by the Louisiana Legislative Auditor's Office to enable progress on the funds. In 2015, it received $553,000 in grants towards the issue. More than $6 million is available once the town's audit is approved by the Auditor's Office.

In December 2016, Governor John Bel Edwards vowed to replace the entire St. Joseph water system. Engineer Bryant Hammett, a Democratic former state representative who performed similar work in his native Ferriday, predicted the project, estimated at $9 million, could be finished by September 2017. Residents were urged not to drink the water or use it in cooking, but they can use it for bathing or washing clothing. The Governor's Office of Homeland Security was providing bottled drinking water for St. Joseph residents.

== Geography ==
According to the United States Census Bureau, the town has a total area of 0.9 square mile (2.3 km^{2}), all land.

=== Climate ===
St. Joseph has a humid subtropical climate (Köppen: Cfa) with long, very hot summers and short, mild winters.

Climate data for St. Joseph 3 N, Louisiana (1991–2020 normals, extremes 1894–present)
Month	Jan	Feb	Mar	Apr	May	Jun	Jul	Aug	Sep	Oct	Nov	Dec	Year
Record high °F (°C)	85 (29)	88 (31)	92 (33)	96 (36)	101 (38)	103 (39)	106 (41)	106 (41)	107 (42)	100 (38)	90 (32)	88 (31)	107 (42)
Mean maximum °F (°C)	76.5 (24.7)	79.7 (26.5)	83.7 (28.7)	88.8 (31.6)	93.0 (33.9)	96.5 (35.8)	98.8 (37.1)	98.9 (37.2)	97.4 (36.3)	92.3 (33.5)	84.6 (29.2)	78.7 (25.9)	100.0 (37.8)
Mean daily maximum °F (°C)	58.6 (14.8)	62.7 (17.1)	70.3 (21.3)	77.5 (25.3)	85.0 (29.4)	90.5 (32.5)	93.0 (33.9)	93.3 (34.1)	89.5 (31.9)	80.5 (26.9)	69.7 (20.9)	61.0 (16.1)	77.6 (25.3)
Daily mean °F (°C)	47.0 (8.3)	50.9 (10.5)	58.0 (14.4)	65.1 (18.4)	73.4 (23.0)	79.6 (26.4)	81.9 (27.7)	81.5 (27.5)	76.8 (24.9)	66.6 (19.2)	56.3 (13.5)	49.4 (9.7)	65.5 (18.6)
Mean daily minimum °F (°C)	35.5 (1.9)	39.0 (3.9)	45.8 (7.7)	52.7 (11.5)	61.8 (16.6)	68.6 (20.3)	70.9 (21.6)	69.7 (20.9)	64.1 (17.8)	52.6 (11.4)	43.0 (6.1)	37.8 (3.2)	53.5 (11.9)
Mean minimum °F (°C)	21.5 (−5.8)	26.7 (−2.9)	30.6 (−0.8)	38.4 (3.6)	49.5 (9.7)	60.3 (15.7)	65.3 (18.5)	62.9 (17.2)	51.1 (10.6)	36.9 (2.7)	27.9 (−2.3)	24.6 (−4.1)	19.6 (−6.9)
Record low °F (°C)	−8 (−22)	−8 (−22)	18 (−8)	29 (−2)	32 (0)	47 (8)	52 (11)	51 (11)	35 (2)	23 (−5)	16 (−9)	5 (−15)	−8 (−22)
Average precipitation inches (mm)	6.25 (159)	5.50 (140)	5.71 (145)	4.86 (123)	4.37 (111)	4.17 (106)	4.68 (119)	4.39 (112)	3.56 (90)	3.80 (97)	5.39 (137)	5.55 (141)	58.23 (1,479)
Average precipitation days (≥ 0.01 in)	9.6	8.8	8.9	6.9	7.4	8.7	8.7	7.9	6.1	6.1	6.5	8.8	94.4
Source: NOAAIEM

== Demographics ==
Historical population
Census	Pop.	Note	%±
1880	486		—
1890	473		−2.7%
1900	717		51.6%
1910	740		3.2%
1920	734		−0.8%
1930	864		17.7%
1940	1,096		26.9%
1950	1,218		11.1%
1960	1,653		35.7%
1970	1,864		12.8%
1980	1,687		−9.5%
1990	1,517		−10.1%
2000	1,340		−11.7%
2010	1,176		−12.2%
2020	831		−29.3%
2025 (est.)	746	▼	−10.2%
U.S. Decennial Census

St. Joseph racial composition as of 2020
Race	Num.	Perc.
White (non-Hispanic)	152	18.29%
Black or African American (non-Hispanic)	641	77.14%
Asian	3	0.36%
Other/Mixed	21	2.53%
Hispanic or Latino	14	1.68%

As of the 2020 United States census, there were 831 people, 377 households, and 200 families residing in the town.

== Education ==
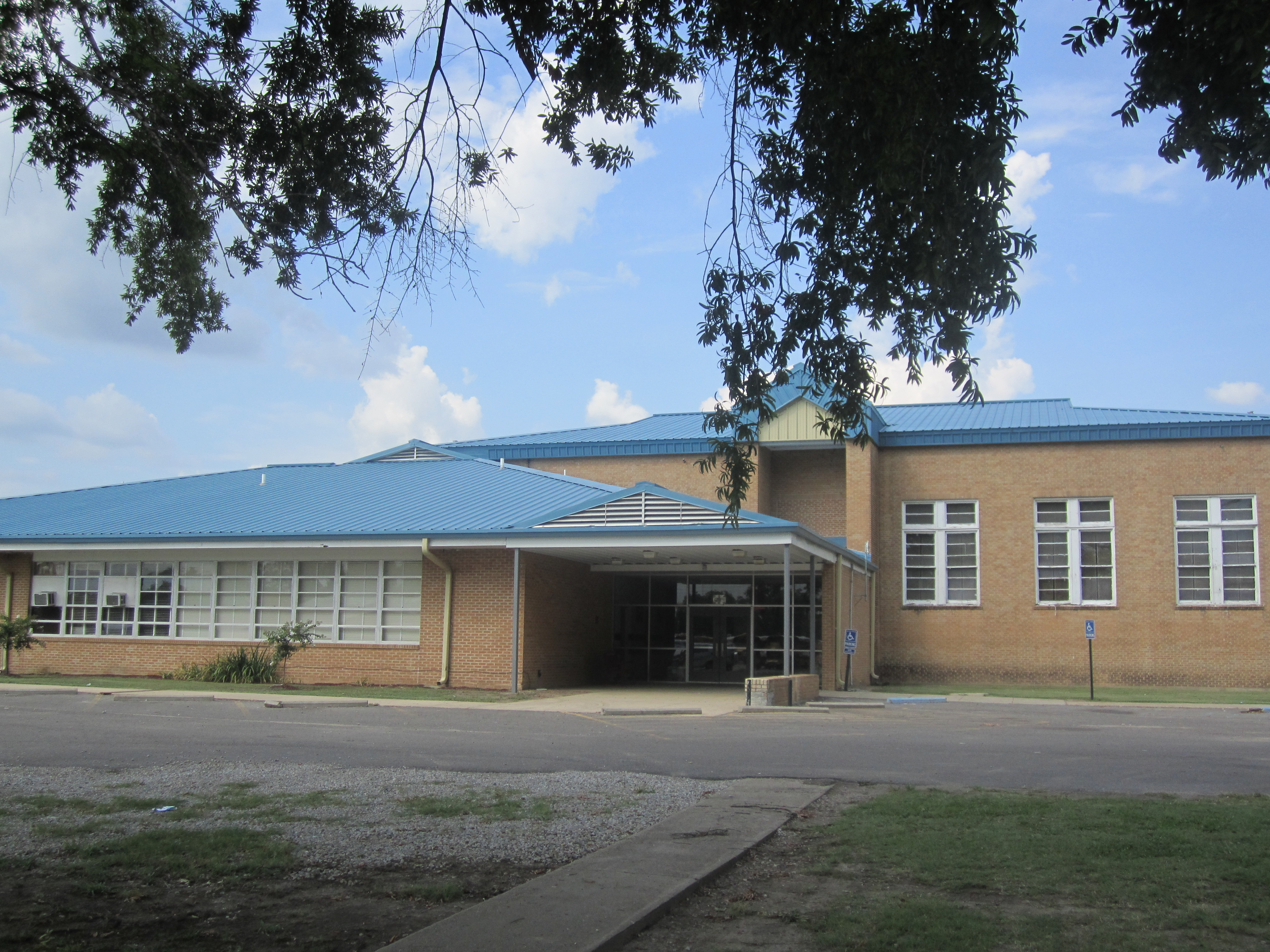
Consolidated Tensas High School in St. Joseph

Tensas High School, a consolidation of three former schools, Joseph Moore Davidson High School in St. Joseph, Newellton High School in Newellton, and Waterproof High School in Waterproof, began operating in the fall of 2006 on the Davidson campus. The Tensas Parish School Board has attempted to improve educational quality by focusing on one high school for the entire parish, which has the smallest population of any parish in Louisiana. Troubles broke out at the school on November 2, 2006, and 14 students were arrested by the sheriff's department. Overt tensions thereafter subsided.

In August 1970, Tensas Academy, a private school, opened in St. Joseph during the first semester of school desegregation after the district was ordered to comply with federal courts. It is still operating.

== Notable people ==
- Daniel F. Ashford (1879–1929), member of the Louisiana House of Representatives.
- Clifford Cleveland Brooks, cotton planter; member of the Louisiana State Senate from 1924 to 1932
- George Henry Clinton, member of both houses of the legislature from Tensas Parish.
- Charles C. Cordill (1855–1916), cotton planter, state senator from 1884 to 1912
- Joseph T. Curry (1895–1961), member of the Louisiana House of Representatives from 1930 to 1944
- Prince McCoy, blues musician, was born in St. Joseph
- Robert H. Snyder Speaker of the Louisiana House of Representatives from 1904 until his death in 1906.
