= Charles C. Cordill =

American politician

Louisiana State Senator for Concordia and Tensas parishes
- In office 1884–1912
- Preceded by: George L. Walton
- Succeeded by: George Henry Clinton

Personal details
- Born: October 13, 1845 Coahoma, Coahoma County; Mississippi, USA
- Died: November 22, 1916 (aged 71)
- Resting place: Natchez City Cemetery in Natchez, Mississippi
- Party: Republican-turned-Democratic (c. 1878)
- Spouse: Never married
- Occupation: Cotton planter

Charles C. Cordill (October 13, 1845 – November 22, 1916) was a cotton planter and politician from Tensas Parish in the northeastern portion of the U.S. state of Louisiana. He was a member of the Louisiana State Senate from 1884 until 1912 in which he represented both Tensas and neighboring Concordia Parish to the south.

== Background ==
Cordill was born in rural Coahoma in Coahoma County near Clarksdale in northwestern Mississippi, the oldest of four children of Joseph Cordill (1816 – 1887) and his first wife, the former Mary Jane Sisson (1828 – 1860). Mary Jane died in childbirth when Charles was fourteen years of age though the child, Francis Marion Cordill (1860–1901), Charles' brother, survived. In 1868, Joseph Cordill married Mary Lu Woodward, and the couple had four children between 1869 and 1877, Charles' half-siblings. It is unclear when Cordill moved to Tensas Parish, probably 1867 or 1868, but it seems likely that he was reared prior to the American Civil War in adjoining Franklin Parish to the west. He was a merchant before he amassed a fortune as a planter.

According to the 1899 property tax rolls, Cordill owned more than three thousand acres, the majority on his Kenilworth Plantation. He had ninety mules and some twenty-five wagons. His annual tax bill exceeded $1,000.

== Political career ==
In the state Senate, Cordill was for a time the chairman of the Agriculture, Commerce, and Levee committees. The latter was particularly important to a river parish like Tensas. Cordill was considered the political boss of Tensas Parish. He was elected parish judge, based in St. Joseph, as a Republican c. 1874, before he was yet thirty years of age. During Reconstruction, he was an ally of Carpetbagger Governor Henry Clay Warmoth. When Reconstruction ended, Cordill quickly turned Democrat to preserve his political power. The judge held court in all kinds of cases every other month six times a year. Cordill was also for twenty-five years the president of the Tensas Parish Police Jury, the parish governing body; at the time a legislator could also serve on the police jury, as both are part-time positions. Cordill's political power rested on the firm support from the white landowners at a time when the African-American constituency was disenfranchised despite the Fifteenth Amendment to the United States Constitution. Tensas Parish at the time had a much greater black population than it does today though it is still a majority black parish. The 1900 census showed Tensas with 1,231 whites and 17,839 blacks.

Cordill's power was challenged in the 1878 general election by a coalition of former Confederate white yeoman farmers and blacks who joined in the "Country People's Ticket". He quickly beat his opponents into submission with physical force even before the election to unseat him could be held.

In 1878, Judge Cordill, a staunch segregationist, pursued a band of African Americans who had killed a Captain Peck of Catahoula Parish. According to "Vignettes" of the American Civil War by Francis McRae Ward, Cordill and his posse of one hundred reached Bass Lane, about a mile north of Waterproof in southern Tensas Parish, in the area near Cordill's plantation, and came upon some approximately one thousand blacks. Rather than wait for reinforcements, Cordill ordered an attack with the expectation, correct as it turned out, that the blacks would flee, rather than fight. Cordill's hunch was based on an event during the Civil War when he, still teenager, and four other soldiers routed a whole company of black soldiers in this same area. Cordill and his men charged, fired their weapons, and yelled loudly. As Cordill had expected the blacks dismounted their horses, fled, and hid in the nearby cotton fields. The challenge to Cordill's rule hence ended with a whimper. The posse members included Carneal Goldman Sr., a Waterproof planter, and William Mackenzie Davidson, later the first mayor of St. Joseph after incorporation.

Cordill also exercised for years what was called "almost dictatorial power" of the Fifth District Levee Board, whose member also included the influential Jefferson B. Snyder, a St. Joseph native who served for forty-four years as an area district attorney.

In 1894, Cordill introduced a bill that would have allowed set up dual voting systems for majority-Black and majority-white parishes. Those in white parishes would be allowed to register without restriction, while those in Black parishes would have to prove they were literate and owned at least $500 in property.

== Death and legacy ==
Cordill died in New Orleans. Cordill's will was probated in New Orleans less than a month after his death. His estate was valued at $2,069,785, or about $58.9 million in 2023 dollars.

Having never married, Cordill left much of his wealth to siblings, nieces, and nephews. He designated $50,000 to a sister, Mattie Cordill Cassidy, of Greenwood, Mississippi, and $40,000 to his namesake nephew, C. C. Cordill, a son of his brother, William Cordill. The other sons of William Cordill receive lesser amounts. Cordill left $10,000 to New Orleans Charity Hospital. He left $1,500 to a servant, Nathaniel Cullens. The will had four codicils and stipulated that anyone contesting its validity or findings would forfeit whatever he would have otherwise received. He was a member of The Boston Club of New Orleans.

Cordill is interred at Natchez City Cemetery in Natchez, Mississippi.

Political offices
Preceded by George L. Walton	Louisiana State Senator for Concordia and Tensas parishes Charles C. Cordill; 1884–1912	Succeeded by George Henry Clinton
