= Newellton, Louisiana =

- Village
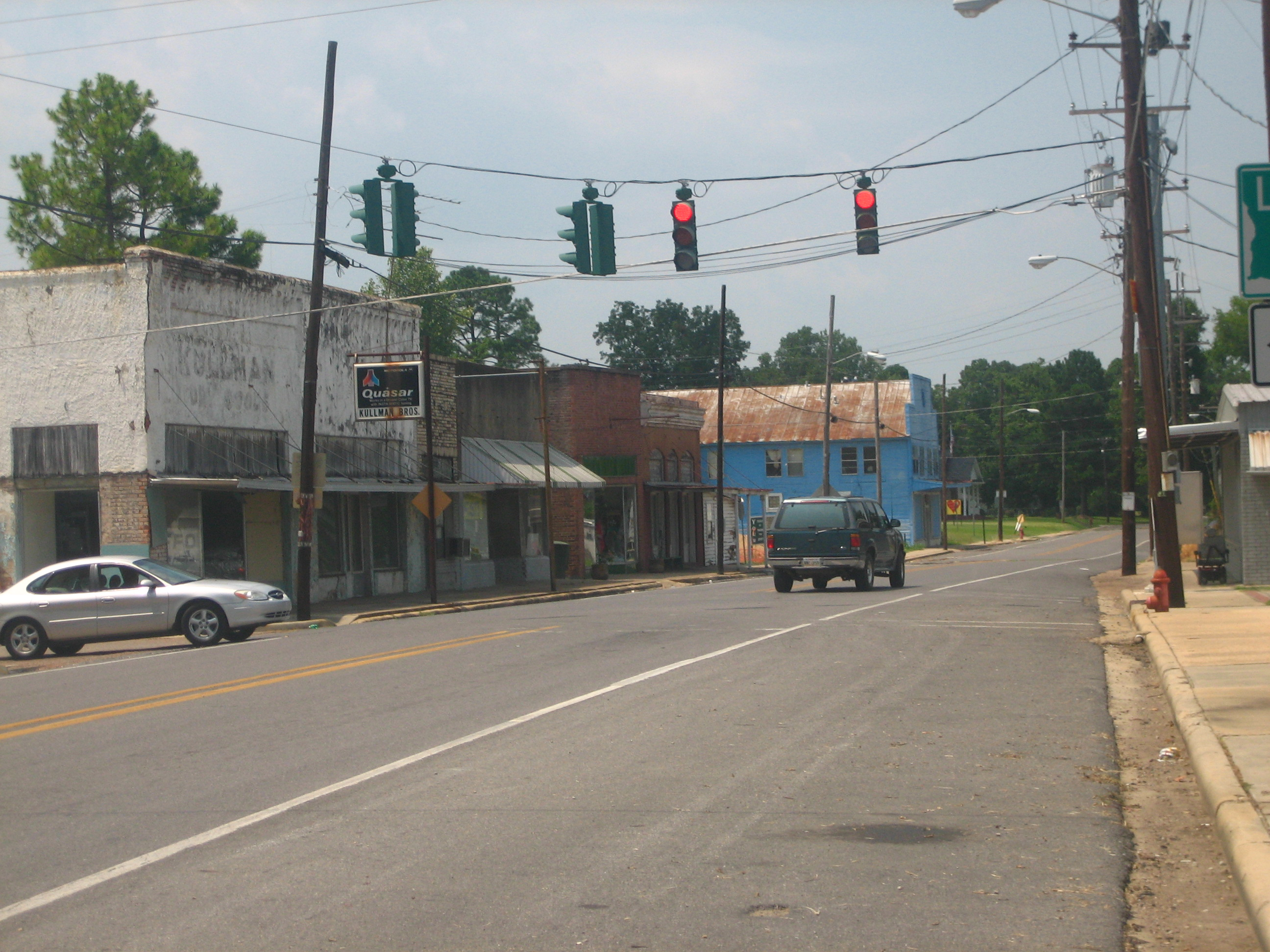
- Downtown Newellton

- Location of Newellton in Tensas Parish, Louisiana.

- Location of Louisiana in the United States
- Coordinates: 32°04′15″N 91°14′40″W
- Country: United States
- State: Louisiana
- Parish: Tensas

Government
  - Mayor: Frankie Robinson

Area
  - Total: 0.87 sq mi (2.26 km^{2})
  - Land: 0.76 sq mi (1.97 km^{2})
  - Water: 0.11 sq mi (0.29 km^{2})
- Elevation: 79 ft (24 m)

Population (2020)
  - Total: 886
  - Density: 1,167.0/sq mi (450.58/km^{2})
- Time zone: CST
  - Summer (DST): UTC-5 (CDT)
- ZIP code: 71357
- Area code: 318
- FIPS code: 22-53930
- GNIS feature ID: 2406985

Newellton is a town in northern Tensas Parish in the northeastern part of the U.S. state of Louisiana. The population was 886 in the 2020 census, a decline of 596 persons, or 40 percent, from the 2000 tabulation of 1,482.

Newellton is west of the Mississippi River on Lake St. Joseph, an ox-bow lake. Further south toward St. Joseph, the parish seat of government, is another ox-bow lake, Lake Bruin, a part of which is the popular Lake Bruin State Park.

== History ==
Newellton itself was founded in the early 19th century by the Routh family, for whom the defunct Routhwood Elementary School was named. John David Stokes Newell Sr., a planter and lawyer in St. Joseph, the seat of Tensas Parish, named the settlement for his father, Edward D. Newell, a native of North Carolina who relocated to Tensas Parish in 1834.

Newellton was designated a village in 1904. On April 4, 1951, under Mayor T. T. Hargrove, Newellton was upgraded to a town through the state Lawrason Act.

In March 2014, Newellton became debt-free.

== Geography ==
According to the United States Census Bureau, the town has a total area of 0.9 square miles (2.3 km^{2}), of which 0.8 square miles (2.1 km^{2}) is land and 0.1 square miles (0.26 km^{2}) (12.64%) is water.

== Demographics ==
Historical population
| Census | Pop. | Note | %± |
|---|---|---|---|
| 1910 | 424 | | — |
| 1920 | 541 | | 27.6% |
| 1930 | 627 | | 15.9% |
| 1940 | 789 | | 25.8% |
| 1950 | 1,280 | | 62.2% |
| 1960 | 1,453 | | 13.5% |
| 1970 | 1,403 | | −3.4% |
| 1980 | 1,726 | | 23.0% |
| 1990 | 1,576 | | −8.7% |
| 2000 | 1,482 | | −6.0% |
| 2010 | 1,187 | | −19.9% |
| 2020 | 886 | | −25.4% |
| 2025 (est.) | 799 | ▼ | −9.8% |
U.S. Decennial Census

Newellton racial composition as of 2020
| Race | Num. | Perc. |
|---|---|---|
| White (non-Hispanic) | 198 | 22.35% |
| Black or African American (non-Hispanic) | 645 | 72.8% |
| Other/Mixed | 31 | 3.5% |
| Hispanic or Latino | 12 | 1.35% |

As of the 2020 United States census, there were 886 people, 403 households, and 245 families residing in the town.

== Government ==
In 2012, the former Newellton mayor, Democrat Alex Davis (born 1942), did not seek a fourth term. The first African American in the position, Davis unseated the 34-year incumbent Edwin G. Preis Sr., a white businessman, in the nonpartisan blanket primary held on October 7, 2000. Davis received 366 votes (56.8 percent) to Preis' 184 (28.6 percent), and Floyd Aaron "Coonie" McVay's 94 votes (14.6 percent). A native of Oak Grove in West Carroll Parish, McVay was formerly the Newellton police chief. He died in 2012 at the age of eighty.

The current mayor is Democrat Timothy Durell Turner, the former District 1 alderman, who won the election held on December 8, 2012, by a single vote, 217–216, over the Republican candidate, James Carroll Fuller Sr. (1936–2021), the former District 5 alderman. Fuller had led Turner, 259 (44.7 percent) to 207 (35.8 percent), in the higher-turnout primary election held on November 6, with another 113 votes (19.5 percent) then cast for a second Democrat, Knola Ransome.

In 2016, Fuller again challenged Turner and once again lost by one vote, 210 for Fuller and 211 for Turner.

Fuller earlier was among 582 Louisiana elected officials named to former Governor Bobby Jindal's "Kitchen Cabinet Leadership Team". Two other Tensas Parish officials appointed to the panel were Assessor Irby Gamble and Coroner Keith D. Butler, both of St. Joseph.

== Notable people ==
- Andrew F. Brimmer (1926–2012), economist and first African American to serve as governor of the Federal Reserve System who was born in Newellton
- Sarah Dorsey, author, historian, and benefactor of Jefferson Davis, lived at the Routh Plantation near Newellton in the early 1850s.
- C.B. Forgotston (born in Newellton in 1945; died 2016) was a lawyer in Hammond and a state government watchdog and political activist. Forgotston graduated from Newellton High School in 1962. He was a frequent guest on The Moon Griffon Show radio talk program.
- Clyde V. Ratcliff (1879–1952), member of the Louisiana State Senate from 1944 to 1948; planter in Newellton
- Thomas M. Wade (1860–1929), member of Louisiana House of Representatives from 1888 to 1904, Louisiana State Board of Education, and Tensas Parish School Board; Tensas school superintendent for some twenty years after 1904 Braylon South: (born Feb 3 2010) he was known for a Numberblock video
