= Waterproof, Louisiana =

- Village
- Village of Waterproof
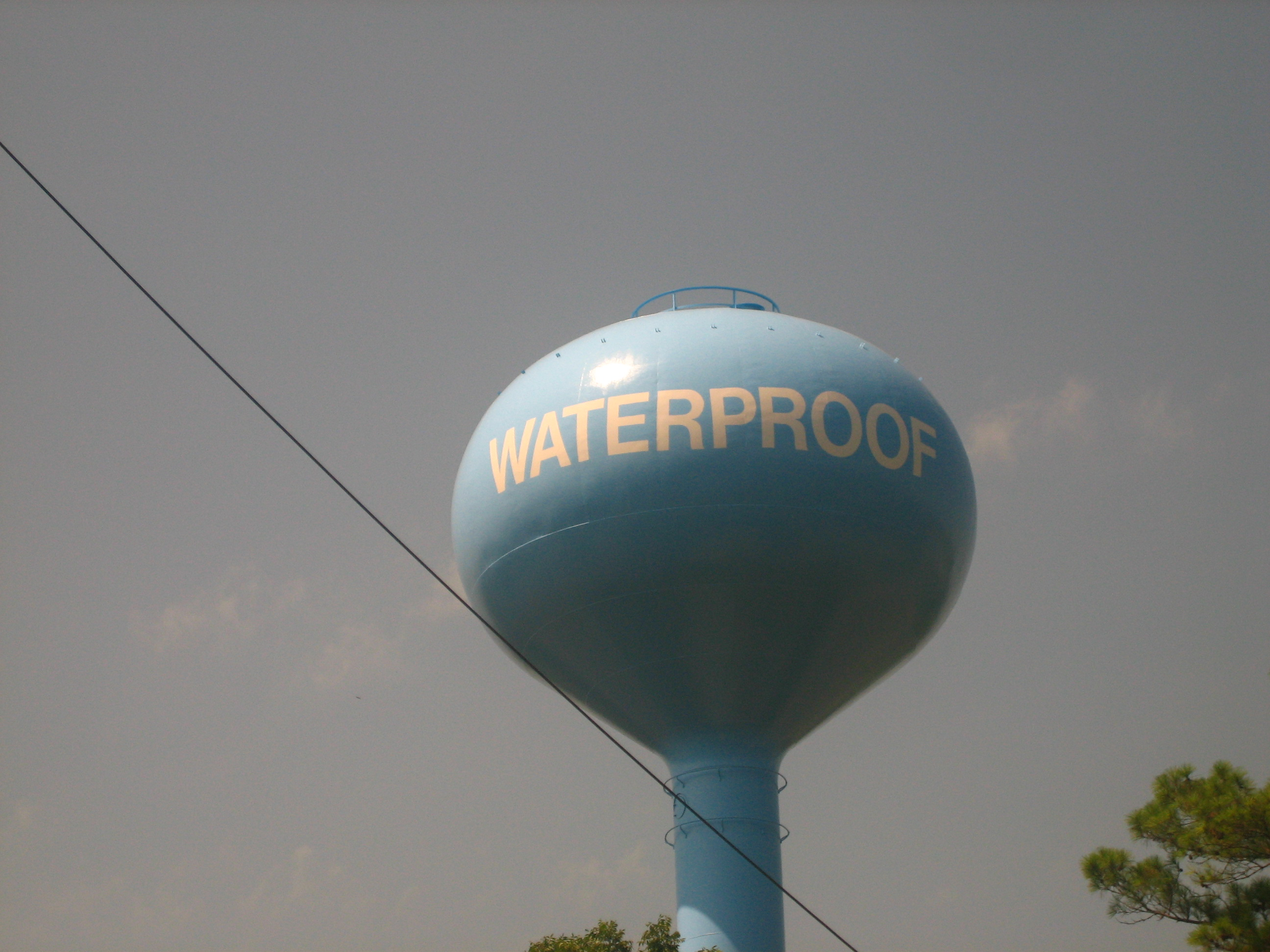
- Water tower in Waterproof, Louisiana
- Motto: A Place You Can Call Home
- Location of Waterproof in Tensas Parish, Louisiana.

- Location of Louisiana in the United States
- Coordinates: 31°48′32″N 91°22′47″W
- Country: United States
- State: Louisiana
- Parish: Tensas

Area
  - Total: 0.70 sq mi (1.81 km^{2})
  - Land: 0.70 sq mi (1.81 km^{2})
  - Water: 0 sq mi (0.00 km^{2})
- Elevation: 66 ft (20 m)

Population (2020)
  - Total: 541
  - Density: 776.3/sq mi (299.72/km^{2})
- Time zone: UTC-6 (CST)
  - Summer (DST): UTC-5 (CDT)
- Area code: 318
- FIPS code: 22-79940
- GNIS feature ID: 2406839

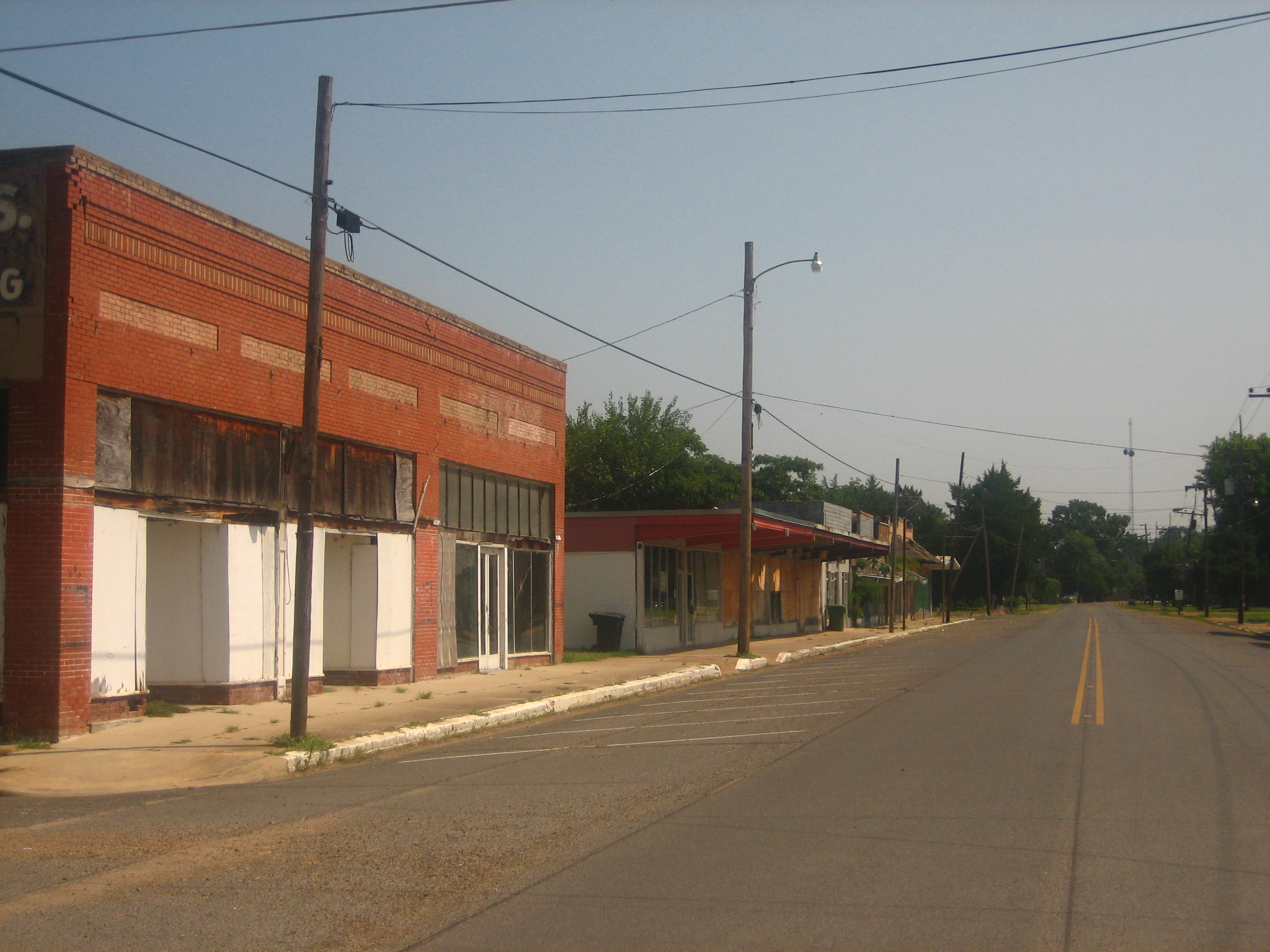
Many businesses in downtown Waterproof have closed

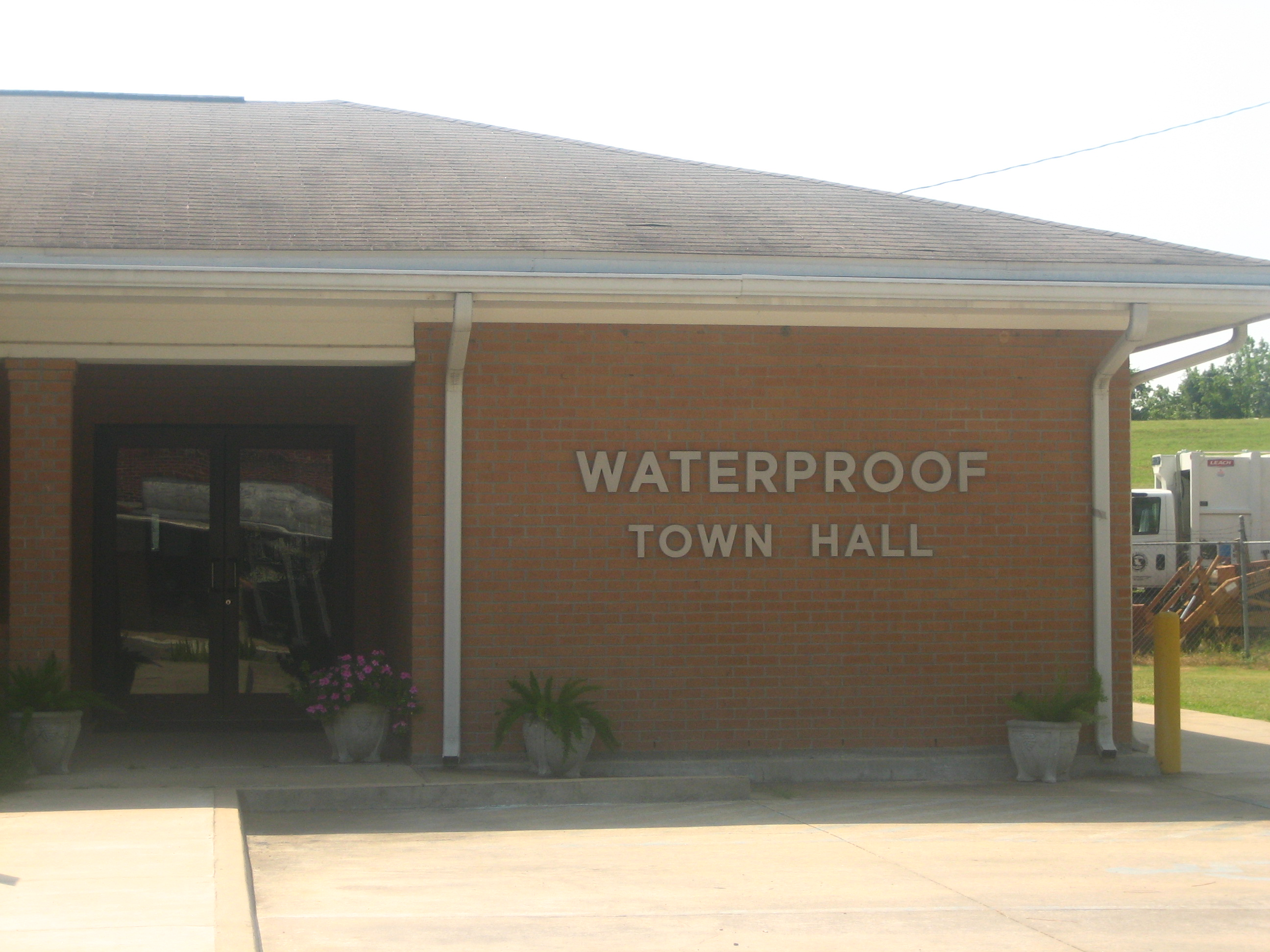
Waterproof Town Hall

Waterproof is a village in Tensas Parish in northeastern Louisiana, United States with a population of 541 as of the 2020 census. In 2010, 91.7 percent of the village population was African American. Some 24 percent of Waterproof residents in 2010 were aged sixty or above.

Waterproof is approximately 17 mi (27 km) north of Ferriday, one of the two principal communities of Concordia Parish. The village is named for its relative safety from flooding prior to construction of the Mississippi River levee system.

With a population dependent on agriculture, the rural village struggles with poverty. Mechanization has decreased the need for farm labor. Industrial-scale cotton is the major commodity crop, but corn and soybeans are also important.

== History ==
=== 20th century to present ===
Jim Crow rules were strong through the segregation era, and the Ku Klux Klan was active in southwest Louisiana through the late 20th century. Although there were 7,000 black citizens living in the parish in 1964, none had been registered to vote. The 4,000 whites controlled parish and city politics for decades. The first 15 black citizens were registered to vote in 1964, after passage of national civil rights legislation.

Three young Waterproof men died in action in the Vietnam War: Carl Raymond Goodfellow, a navy ensign; Robert Lee Ross, an army private; and Douglas Mac Washington, an army sergeant.

As of 1990, Waterproof hosted "a general store, a grocery, two gas stations, two banks and the Western Auto franchise".

The village has the Tensas Parish Detention Center South. This prison facility holds inmates sentenced in Waterproof and Tensas Parish courts and courts of other cities in the Tensas Parish area. It has recently been used to detain undocumented immigrants. The listed address of Tensas Parish Detention Center South is 8606 Highway 65.

On December 8, 2018, the village elected its youngest mayor in history, Jarrod Randell Bottley, an African American male. He was 31 years old at the time and serves the town on a full-time basis.

=== Case against mayor and police chief ===
In September 2006 Bobby D. Higginbotham was elected as mayor of Waterproof. After taking office, he hired Miles Jenkins as chief of police. Both native to Waterproof, the two African-American men had also lived and worked for years in other cities, including New Orleans. Jenkins had a 30-year career in the US military and earned a master's degree in public administration from Troy University in Alabama. He started to professionalize the small town police department.

On July 24, 2007, Parish Sheriff Rickey A. Jones, who is white, arrested Higginbotham on counts of impersonating a police officer, criminal trespass, and felony criminal damage to property. Higginbotham claimed that Jones arrested him in order to prevent his running for sheriff again in the October 20, 2007, non-partisan blanket primary. Jones said he incurred $7,500 in legal fees before he took office as sheriff because Higginbotham sued him over allegations of a "rigged" election. In the 2007 primary, Jones defeated Higginbotham, 2,188 votes (77.6 percent) to 631 votes (22.4 percent).

Jones and District Attorney James E. Paxton of the Louisiana 6th Judicial District, who was elected in 2008, recognized Caldwell A. Flood Jr., as the bona fide mayor of Waterproof. Police chief Miles Perkins was also arrested and charged for profiting from traffic tickets.

In March 2010, Police Chief Miles Jenkins filed a lawsuit asserting conspiracy by Jones, Paxton, and other members of the white power structure to prevent the legal exercise of power by black elected officials. He said that he and Higginbotham were illegally forced from office and prosecuted by white officials. He cited numerous arrests by Jones and prosecution by Paxton, on charges that observers said they had never heard used against a police official. The case was closely watched by civil rights activists.

Although the village is 55% black, Higginbotham was convicted by a jury of 11 whites and one black in 2010 of two charges: malfeasance in office and felony theft. He was sentenced to five years of hard labor, two years suspended, for malfeasance and seven years hard labor, three years suspended, for felony theft. The conviction was reversed and the sentence was vacated by the Second Circuit Court of Appeals in April 2012, based on trial irregularities, including missing witness testimonies. Higginbotham had been freed on parole for good behavior in December 2011. The Louisiana State Supreme Court denied a writ of certiorari. In 2016, the US Court of Appeals, Fifth Circuit, upheld the District Court decision denying habeas relief.

== Demographics ==
Historical population
Census	Pop.	Note	%±
1880	316		—
1900	298		—
1910	445		49.3%
1920	340		−23.6%
1930	420		23.5%
1940	592		41.0%
1950	1,180		99.3%
1960	1,412		19.7%
1970	1,438		1.8%
1980	1,339		−6.9%
1990	1,080		−19.3%
2000	834		−22.8%
2010	688		−17.5%
2020	541		−21.4%
2025 (est.)	489	▼	−9.6%
U.S. Decennial Census

=== 2020 census ===
Waterproof racial composition
Race	Num.	Perc.
White (non-Hispanic)	30	5.55%
Black or African American (non-Hispanic)	491	90.76%
Asian	1	0.18%
Other/Mixed	9	1.66%
Hispanic or Latino	10	1.85%

As of the 2020 United States census, there were 541 people, 287 households, and 156 families residing in the town.

=== 2000 census ===
As of the census of 2000, there were 834 people, 353 households, and 194 families residing in the town. The population density was 1,197.9 inhabitants per square mile (462.5/km^{2}). There were 427 housing units at an average density of 613.3 per square mile (236.8/km^{2}). The racial makeup of the town was 87.41% African American, 11.87% White, and 0.72% from two or more races. Hispanic or Latino of any race were 0.96% of the population.

In 2010, the African-American proportion of the declining, aged population was 91.7 percent.

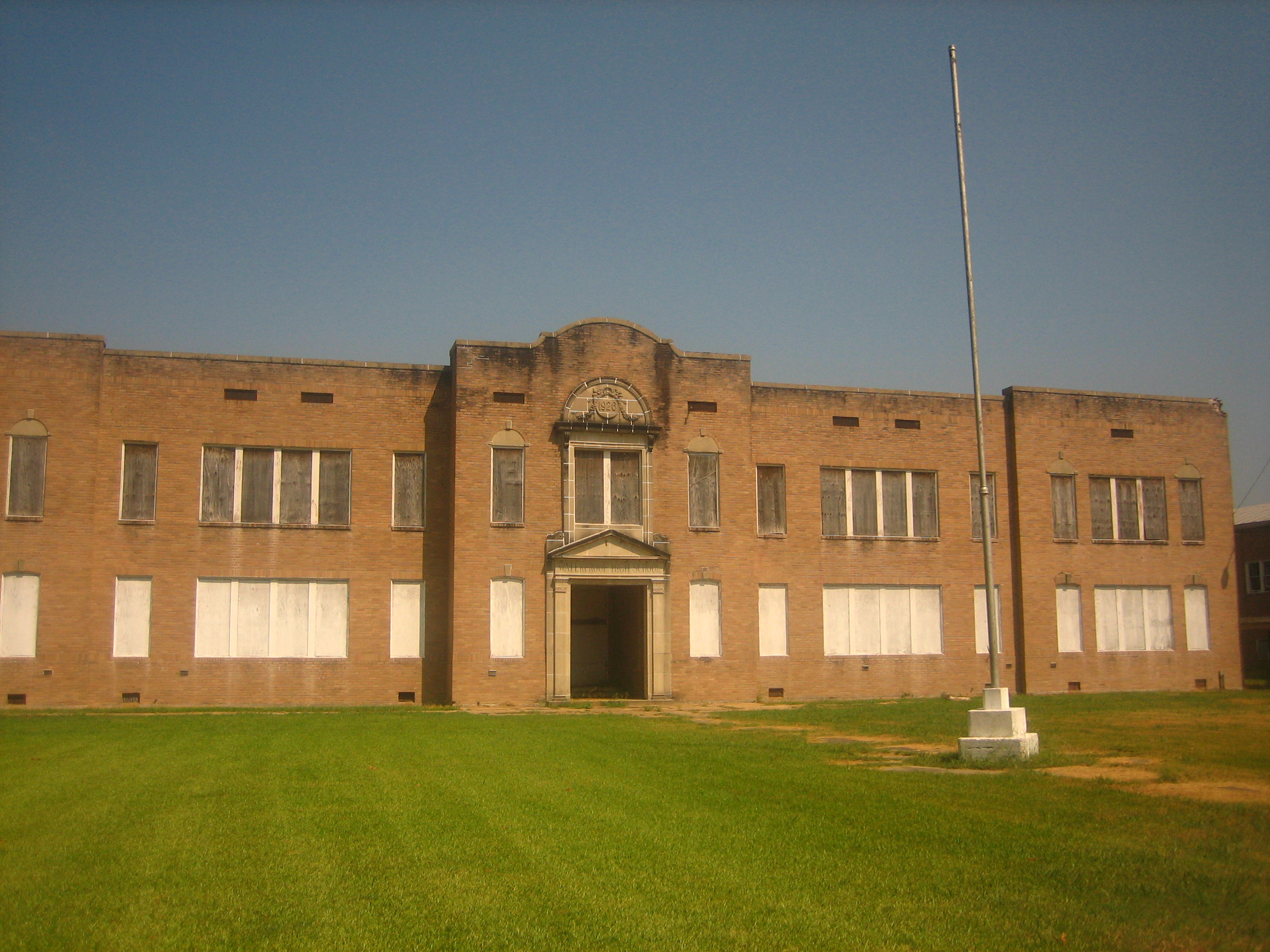
The former Waterproof High School is one four sites in Waterproof listed on the National Register of Historic Places

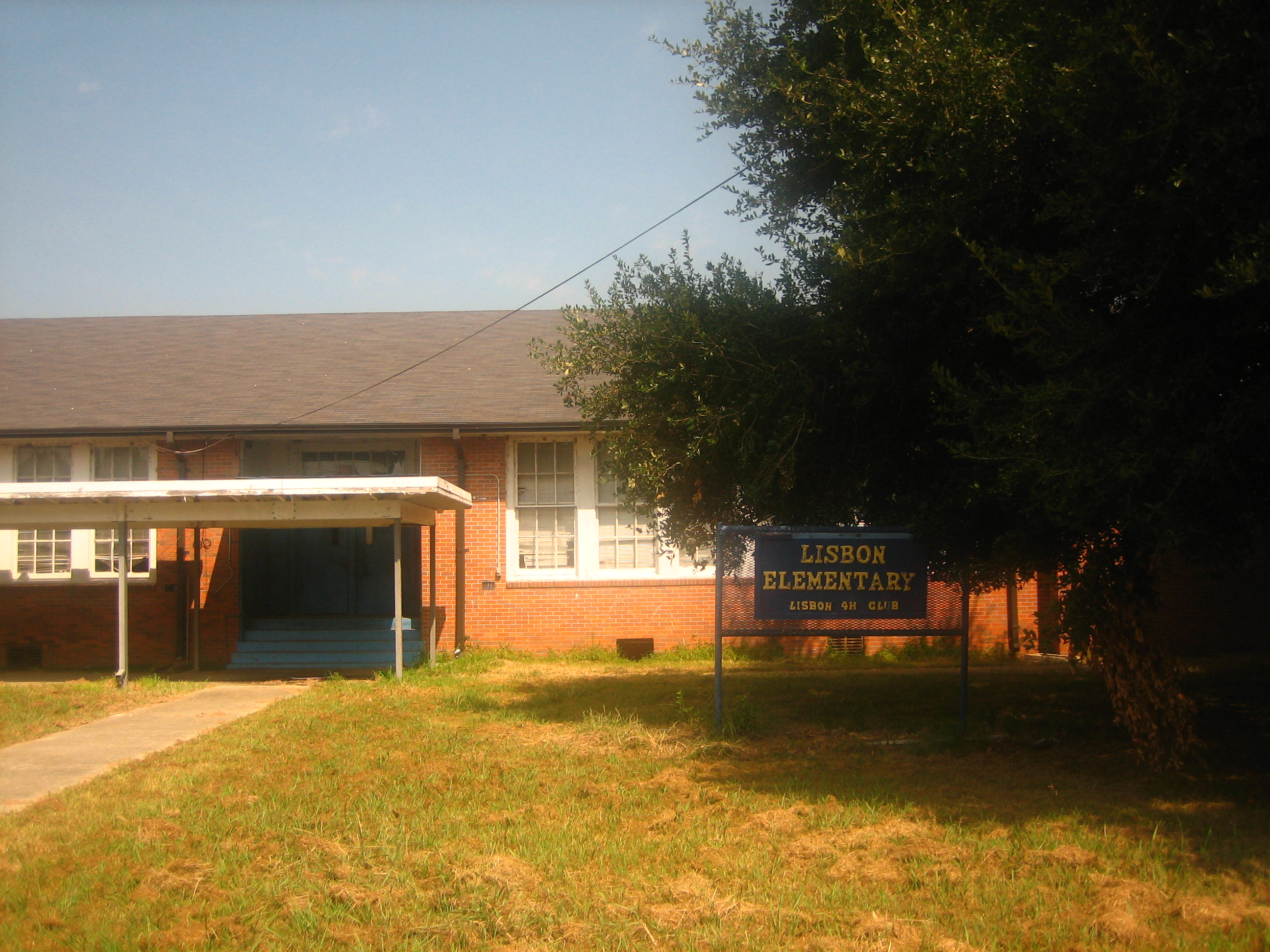
The former Lisbon Elementary School in Waterproof

In 2000, there were 353 households, out of which 24.6% had children under the age of 18 living with them, 23.2% were married couples living together, 28.0% had a female householder with no husband present, and 44.8% were non-families. 40.8% of all households were made up of individuals, and 21.0% had someone living alone who was 65 years of age or older. The average household size was 2.36 and the average family size was 3.30.

In the town, the population was spread out, with 28.8% under the age of 18, 8.2% from 18 to 24, 19.5% from 25 to 44, 25.2% from 45 to 64, and 18.3% who were 65 years of age or older. The median age was 41 years. For every 100 females, there were 75.6 males. For every 100 females age 18 and over, there were 66.9 males.

The median income for a household in the town was $10,250, and the median income for a family was $15,179. Males had a median income of $21,250 versus $14,792 for females. The per capita income for the town was $9,523. About 44.5% of families and 51.1% of the population were below the poverty line, including 57.8% of those under age 18 and 57.6% of those age 65 or over.

== Notable people ==
- Franklin O. Adams, architect; born in Waterproof.
- Sharon Renee Brown, Miss Louisiana USA 1961, Miss USA 1961 and Miss Waterproof in 1961
- Claire Chennault (1893–1958), career officer and member of Flying Tigers
- Charles C. Cordill, planter and politician living near Waterproof; Louisiana state senator from 1884 to 1912.
- John Henry Johnson, professional football player
- Samuel W. Martien, cotton planter and politician, member of Louisiana House of Representatives from 1906 to 1920.
- J. C. Seaman, state representative from 1944 to 1964; born in Waterproof.
- Matthew Walker Sr., one of the first African Americans to become a Fellow of the American College of Surgeons.
- Johnny Weekly, professional baseball player; born in Waterproof.
