= Frogmore (disambiguation) =

Frogmore is a private estate in Windsor Great Park in Berkshire, England.

Frogmore may also refer to:

== Places ==
=== Australia ===
- Frogmore, New South Wales

=== Canada ===
- Frogmore, Ontario

=== United Kingdom ===
- Frogmore House, on the Frogmore Estate in Berkshire
  - Royal Burial Ground, Frogmore
- Frogmore, Cornwall
- Frogmore, Devon
- Frogmore, Hampshire
- Frogmore, Hertfordshire
- Frogmore, Wiltshire, an area of Westbury

=== United States ===
- Frogmore, Concordia Parish, Louisiana, unincorporated community
- Frogmore, Pointe Coupee Parish, Louisiana, unincorporated community
- Frogmore, South Carolina, unincorporated community
- Frogmore (Ferriday, Louisiana), historic plantation in Concordia Parish, Louisiana
  - Frogmore Mound Site, archaeological site
- Frogmore (Edisto Island, South Carolina), plantation house in Charleston County, South Carolina
- Frogmore Plantation Complex in Beaufort County, South Carolina

== Other uses ==
- The Frogmore Papers, British literary journal published by the Frogmore Press
- Frogmore Community College, a community secondary school in Yateley, Hampshire
