= Vidalia =

Vidalia may refer to:

- Vidalia (alga), a genus of red algae in the family Rhodomelaceae
- Vidalia (fly), a genus of tephritid or fruit flies in the family Tephritidae

== Places ==
- Vidalia, Georgia
  - Vidalia, Georgia, micropolitan area, an area defined by the United States Census Bureau
  - Vidalia Regional Airport, in Georgia
- Vidalia, Louisiana
  - Natchez–Vidalia Bridge, two twin cantilever bridges carrying US Routes 65, 84 and 425 across the Mississippi River between Vidalia, Louisiana and Natchez, Mississippi

== Institutions ==
- Vidalia High School (disambiguation)
  - Vidalia High School (Louisiana)

== Other ==
- Vidalia onion, a sweet onion of certain varieties, grown in a production area defined by law in Georgia
- Vidalia (software), a software program which is a cross-platform controller GUI for Tor, built using the Qt toolkit
- "Vidalia" (song), a song recorded by Sammy Kershaw
- Vidalia Fern.-Vill., a taxonomic synonym of the plant genus Mesua
