= Zappe =

Zappe is a surname. Notable people with the surname include:

- Bailey Zappe (born 1999), American football player
- Magdaléna Zappe (1757–1819), Austrian actress and dancer

== See also ==
- Zappe Boarding House, building on the US National Register of Historic Places in Ferriday, Louisiana
