= List of United States post office murals in Louisiana =

Following is a list of United States post office murals created in Louisiana between 1934 and 1943.

Location	Mural title	Image	Artist	Date	Notes	NRHPlisted
Abbeville	The Harvest		Louis Raynaud	1939	on display at the Abbeville Museum	
Arcadia	Cotton Time		Allison B. Curry	1942	oil on canvas	
Bunkie	Cotton Pickers		Caroline Rohland	1939	oil on canvas	
Covington	Tung Oil Industry		Xavier Gonzalez	1939	the former Covington Post Office is now The Southern Hotel	
DeRidder	Rural Free Delivery		Conrad A. Albrizio	1936	building now houses the Beauregard Community Action Association	
U.S. Post Office (Ferriday, Louisiana) in Ferriday				1939	post office in the National Register-listed Ferriday Commercial Historic District	
Gretna	Steamboats on the Mississippi		Stuart R. Purser	1939	relocated to the Finance Station Post Office building	
Hammond	Strawberry Farming		Xavier Gonzalez	1937		
Haynesville	Agriculture and History of Clairborne City		Joseph Pistey, Jr.	1939	oil on canvas	
Jenerette	Sugar Cane Mill		Hollis Holbrook	1941	fresco	
Lake Providence	Life on the Lake		Ethel Edwards	1942		
Oakdale	Air Express		Harry Lane	1939		
Rayville	LaSalle's Quest for the Mississippi		Elsie Diggs	1939		
St. Martinville	Evangeline		Minetta Good	1940		
Tallulah	The River		Francisca Negueloua	1938	fresco	
Ville Platte	Louisiana Bayou		Paul Rohland	1939	Relocated from the original post office to the present building in 1971	
Winnsboro	Logging in the Louisiana Swamps		Datus Ensign Myers	1939	building is now a museum. The final mural differs from the study (shown in the image here).	
