= Fruit fly =

Fruit fly may refer to:

== Organisms ==
- Drosophilidae, a family of small flies, including:
  - Drosophila, the genus of small fruit flies and vinegar flies
  - Drosophila melanogaster or common fruit fly
  - Drosophila suzukii or Asian fruit fly
- Tephritidae, a family of large flies
  - Bactrocera cucurbitae or melon fly
  - Bactrocera oleae or olive fruit fly
  - Bactrocera tryoni or Queensland fruit fly
  - Vidalia (fly), a genus
  - Ceratitis capitata, the Mediterranean fruit fly

== Other uses ==
- Fruit Fly (film), 2009 film directed by H. P. Mendoza
- Fruit (slang) § Fruit fly, LGBT slang with a meaning similar to fag hag
