= Piazza Cotton Gin =

- U.S. National Register of Historic Places
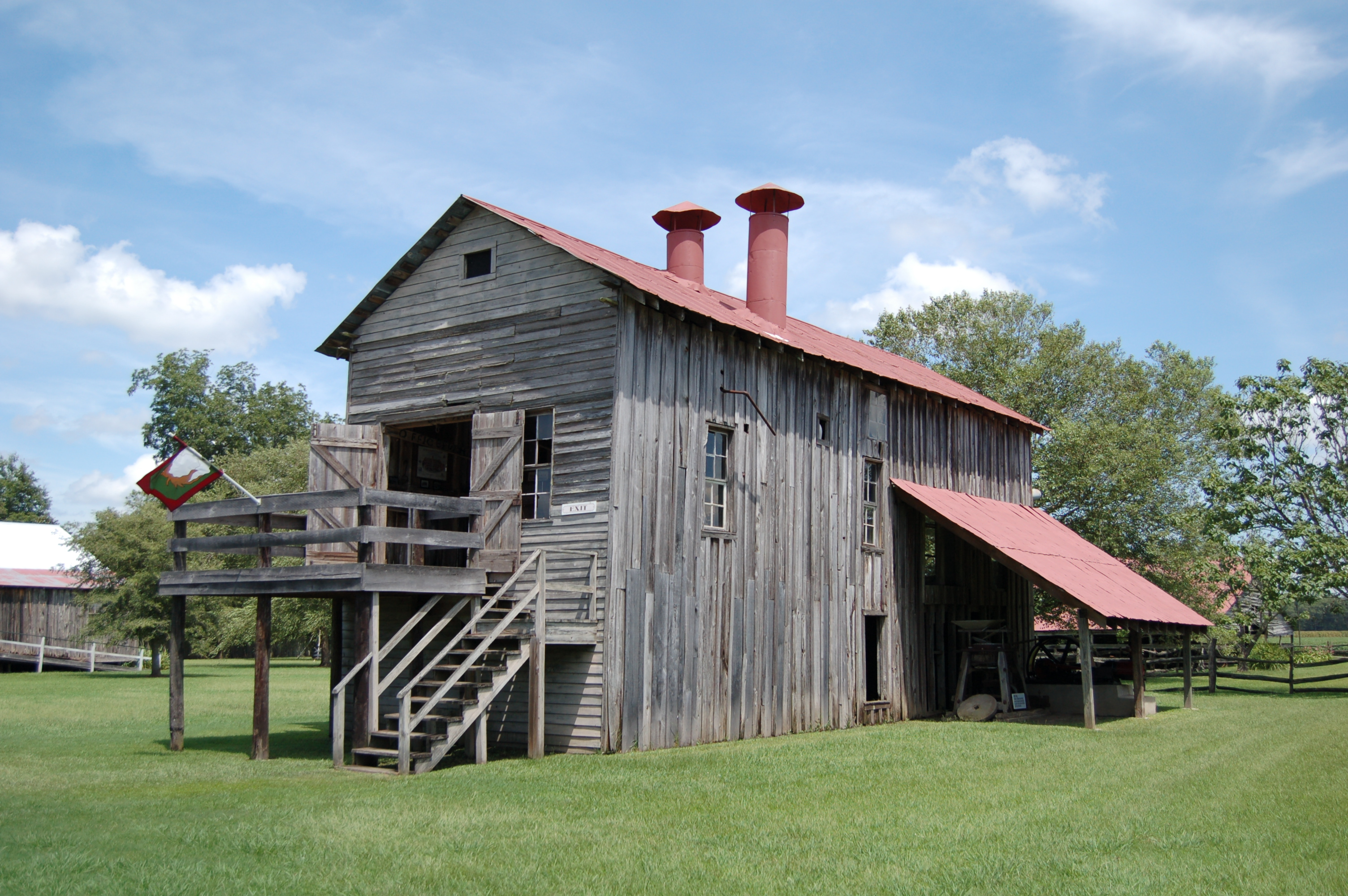

- Location within Louisiana Location within the United States
- Location: Frogmore Plantation, 11656 US 84, about 7 miles (11 km) west of Ferriday
- Nearest city: Ferriday, Louisiana
- Coordinates: 31°36′21″N 91°40′10″W
- Area: less than one acre
- Built: c.1880
- Built by: Gullett Gin Co.; Munger's
- Architectural style: Cotton Gin
- NRHP reference No.: 99000049
- Added to NRHP: January 27, 1999

The Piazza Cotton Gin is on the Frogmore Plantation at 11656 U.S. Highway 84, about 7 miles (11 km) west of Ferriday, Louisiana in Concordia Parish, Louisiana. The building containing the cotton gin press was built c.1880, while the machinery was added c.1900. The gin itself is a system cotton gin, which was invented by Robert S. Munger. This invention was the second major revolution in cotton processing (after the original gin was invented by Eli Whitney). This example is one of the few (and perhaps the only one) left in existence.

It is a two-story building with ginning/pressing equipment. It was moved to its current location from across the Mississippi River in Rodney, Mississippi in 1997.

The building is estimated to have been started c.1880 based on square nails used in its construction; some of the equipment bears 1883 and 1884 patent dates.

The property was listed on the National Register of Historic Places in 1999.

== See also ==
- Frogmore Plantation
- Frogmore Mound Site, also located in Frogmore Plantation
- National Register of Historic Places listings in Concordia Parish, Louisiana
