= Bob Barber (American football) =

American football player (born 1951)

No. 70
- Position: Defensive end

Personal information
- Born: December 26, 1951 (age 74); Ferriday, Louisiana, U.S.
- Listed height: 6 ft 3 in (1.91 m)
- Listed weight: 240 lb (109 kg)

Career information
- High school: Ferriday
- College: Grambling State
- NFL draft: 1975: 2nd round, 51st overall pick

Career history
- Green Bay Packers (1976–1979)

Career NFL statistics
- Sacks: 13.5
- Fumble recoveries: 4
- Games started: 22
- Stats at Pro Football Reference

Robert J. Barber (born December 26, 1951) is an American former professional football player who was a defensive end for the Green Bay Packers of the National Football League (NFL). Barber played college football for the Grambling State Tigers before being selected by the Pittsburgh Steelers in the second round of the 1975 NFL draft. The Steelers subsequently traded him to the Packers. Barber played in the NFL for four seasons and retired from the NFL in 1979. After retiring from the NFL in 1979 he went on to play in the CFL in the years 1980 and 1981, and eventually retiring after a season in the USFL in 1983.
