= Killarney (Ferriday, Louisiana) =

Historic house in Louisiana, United States

- U.S. National Register of Historic Places
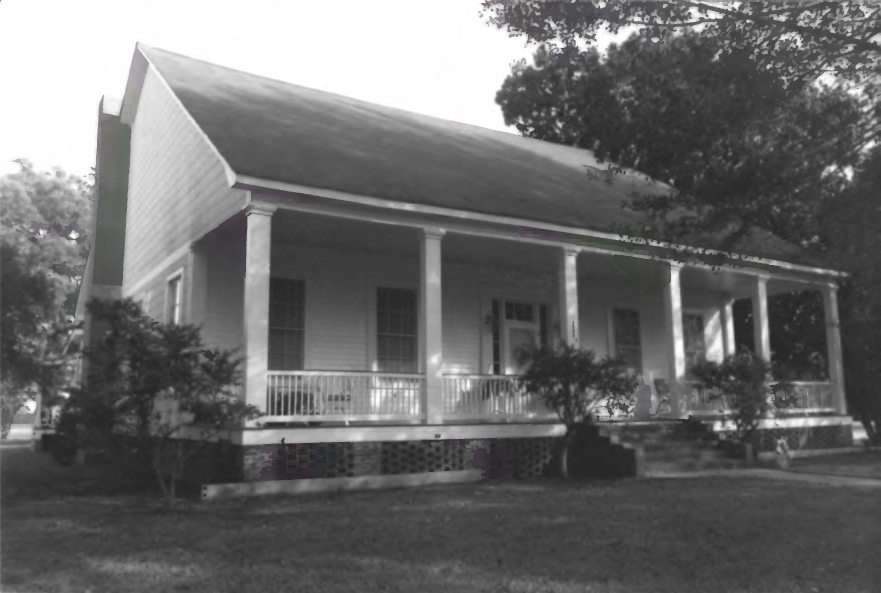

- Location within Louisiana Location within the United States
- Location: Along LA 569, about 8 miles (13 km) northeast of Ferriday
- Nearest city: Ferriday, Louisiana
- Coordinates: 31°42′32″N 91°27′01″W
- Area: 3.8 acres (1.5 ha)
- Built: 1855
- Architectural style: Greek Revival
- NRHP reference No.: 99000235
- Added to NRHP: February 18, 1999

Killarney, also known as Lower Killarney and Alabama Plantation House, is a historic mansion in Ferriday, Louisiana, U.S.. It was built in 1855, a decade prior to the American Civil War of 1861–1865.

The house has been listed on the National Register of Historic Places on February 18, 1999.

== See also ==
- List of plantations in Louisiana
- National Register of Historic Places listings in Concordia Parish, Louisiana
