= Canebrake (Ferriday, Louisiana) =

Historic house in Louisiana, United States

- U.S. National Register of Historic Places
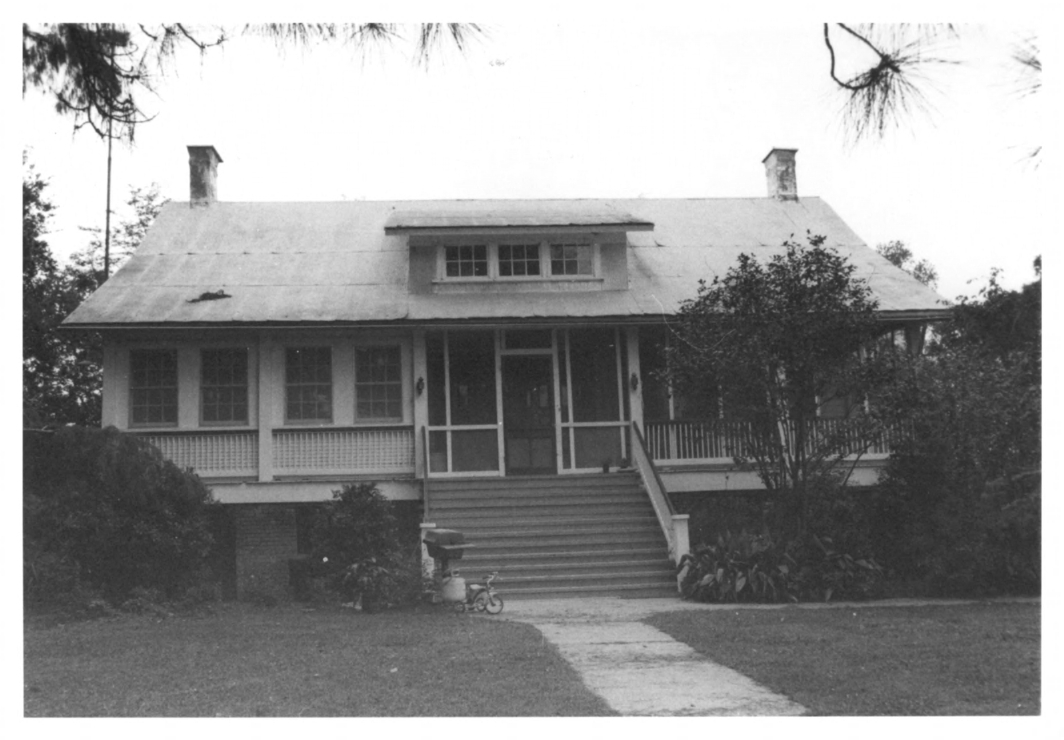

- Location within Louisiana Location within the United States
- Location: Along Maxwell Road, about 2.9 miles (4.7 km) east of Spokane, Louisiana and about 9.7 miles (15.6 km) northeast of Ferriday
- Nearest city: Ferriday, Louisiana
- Coordinates: 31°41′56″N 91°24′41″W
- Area: 8.5 acres (3.4 ha)
- Built: 1840
- NRHP reference No.: 82002767
- Added to NRHP: August 29, 1982

Canebrake is a historic plantation house in Ferriday, Louisiana. The house was located inside a 531 acres (215 ha) cotton plantation as part of forced-labor operation. The site is west of Mississippi River and east of Lake St. John.

The house was built in c.1840 and has been remodeled in 1850-1860 and in 1910, after the plantation was purchased by Arthur Meserve.

The house and the nearby 8.5 acres (3.4 ha) area, comprising several outbuildings was listed on the National Register of Historic Places on August 29, 1982.

== See also ==
- List of plantations in Louisiana
- National Register of Historic Places listings in Concordia Parish, Louisiana
