= Roseland (Ferriday, Louisiana) =

Historic house in Louisiana, United States

- U.S. National Register of Historic Places
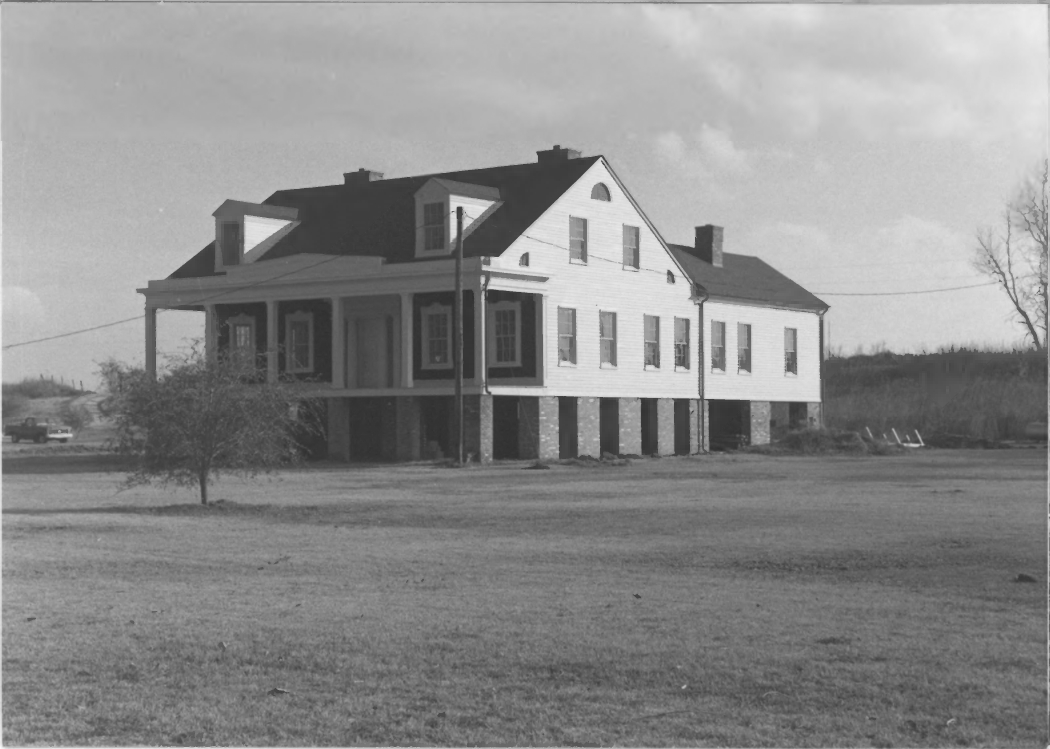

- Location within Louisiana Location within the United States
- Location: 916 Huntington Stadium Fisherman South Drive, Ferriday
- Coordinates: 31°37′12″N 91°32′20″W
- Area: 9.3 acres (3.8 ha)
- Built: 1832-1850
- Architectural style: Greek Revival
- NRHP reference No.: 85003002
- Added to NRHP: October 10, 1985

Roseland is a historic mansion located at 916 Huntington Stadium Fisherman South Drive, Ferriday. The house is located in a 9.3 acres (3.8 ha) area along southwestern shore of Lake Concordia, about 1 mile (1.6 km) southeast of Ferriday. It was built between 1832 and 1850 as part of a plantation and was moved twice, in c.1965 and in 1977, before reaching its actual position. Despite the movements and a certain number of alterations, the mansion retains its historical integrity.

The house has been listed on the National Register of Historic Places on October 10, 1985.

== See also ==
- List of plantations in Louisiana
- National Register of Historic Places listings in Concordia Parish, Louisiana
