= Frogmore Plantation =

Historic house in Louisiana, United States

- Gillespie
- U.S. National Register of Historic Places
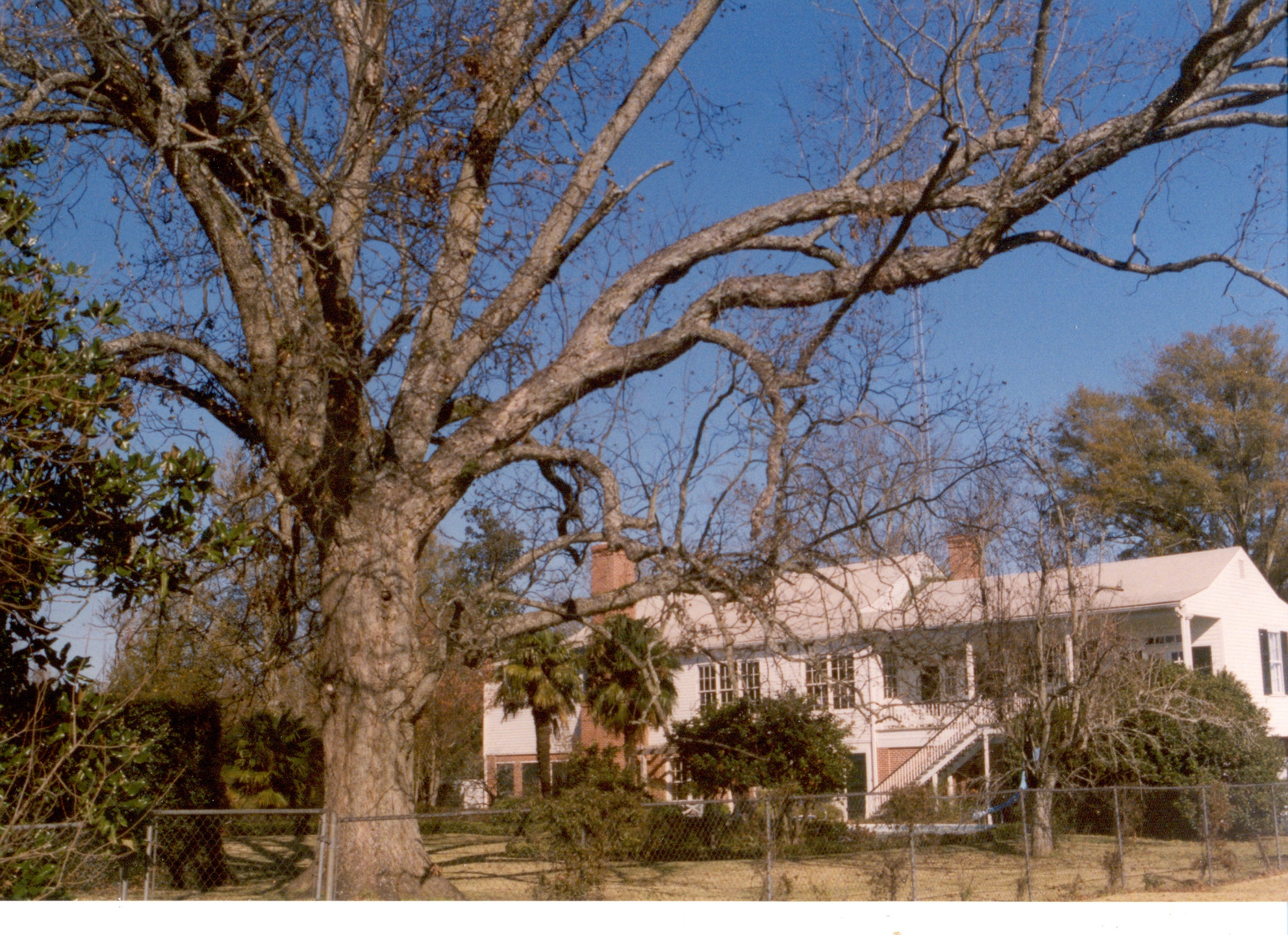

- Location within Louisiana
- Location: 11656 US 84, about 7 miles (11 km) west of Ferriday
- Nearest city: Ferriday, Louisiana
- Coordinates: 31°36′24″N 91°40′07″W
- Area: 0.7 acres (0.28 ha)
- Built: 1843
- Architect: John F. Gillespie
- Architectural style: Greek Revival
- NRHP reference No.: 80001712
- Added to NRHP: May 31, 1980

Frogmore Plantation is an historic, privately owned cotton plantation complex, located near Ferriday in Concordia Parish, Louisiana. Since 1997, Frogmore Plantation is a working farm, tourist attraction featuring many structures, and educational center. Buildings on the site include a cotton gin, and a plantation manor house named Gillespie. Formerly this plantation relied on enslaved African American labor.

It was added to the National Register of Historic Places on May 31, 1980.

== History ==
The gin is a system cotton gin, which was invented by Robert S. Munger. This invention was the second major revolution in cotton processing (after the original gin was invented by Eli Whitney). This example is one of the few (and perhaps the only one) left in existence.

The historic plantation house is named Gillespie and included on its property are a slave row of cabins and numerous outbuildings, or dependencies. Gillespie was built in c. 1843 in Greek Revival style.

The plantation includes another two properties individually listed in the National Register of Historic Places. An archeological site shortly southwest of the house, named Frogmore Mound was added in July 2004, and a cotton gin, moved to the property from another location in order to have a working plantation and named Piazza Cotton Gin was added in January 1999.

One of the owners of Frogmore Plantation, Lynette Tanner, published a book about narrations of former slaves that resided within Louisiana, Chained to the Land: Voices from Cotton and Cane Plantations (2014). Tanner was inspired to publish the book after the Frogmore Plantation was opened in 1997 for public history tours.

On July 26, 2019, a fire broke out at the plantation, it destroyed the main house.

== See also ==
- Frogmore Mound Site, also located in Frogmore Plantation and listed in the National Register of Historic Places
- Piazza Cotton Gin, also located in Frogmore Plantation and listed in the National Register of Historic Places
- National Register of Historic Places listings in Concordia Parish, Louisiana
- List of plantations in Louisiana
