= Lisburn Plantation =

Historic house in Louisiana, United States

- Lisburn Plantation House
- U.S. National Register of Historic Places
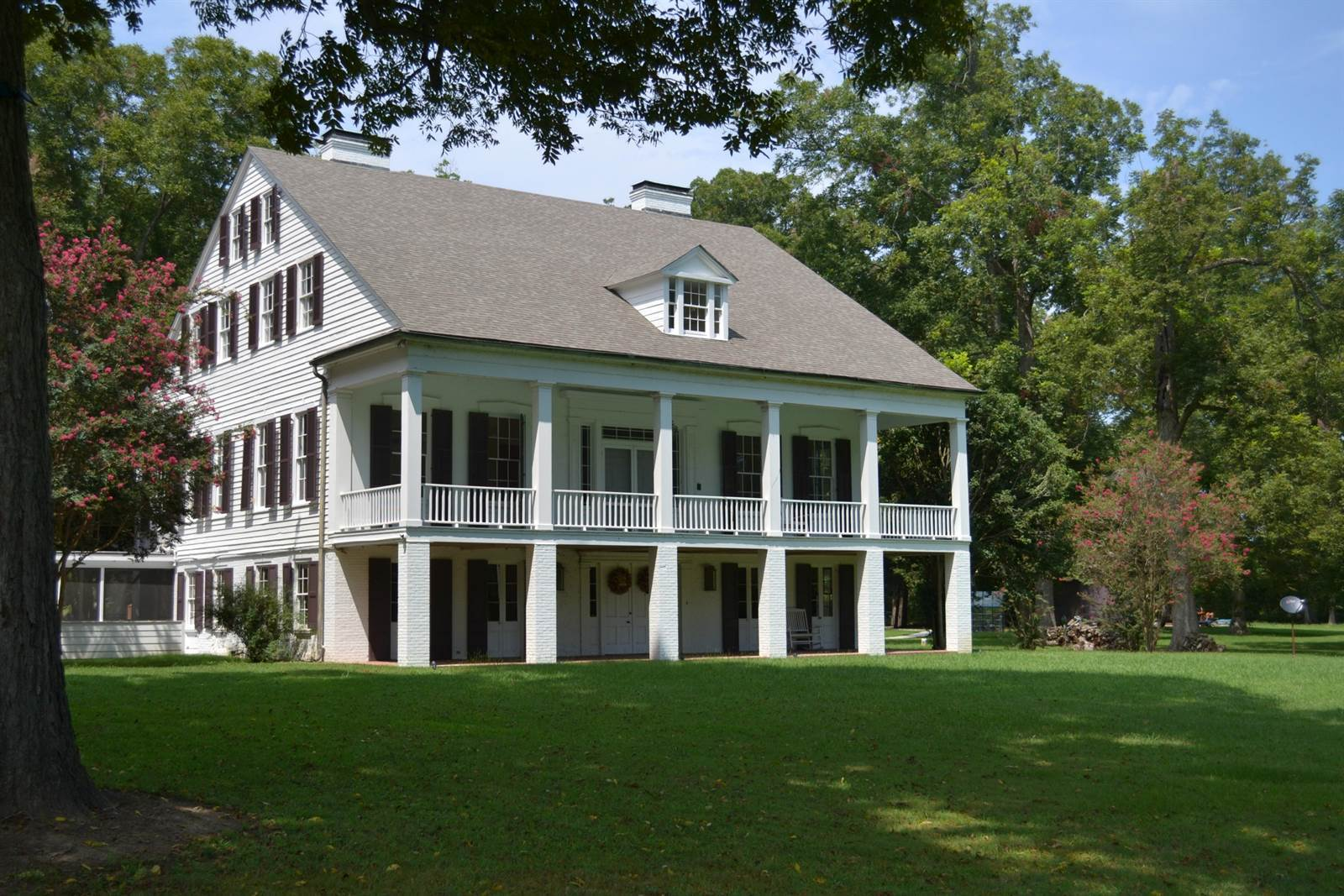

- Location within Louisiana Location within the United States
- Location: Along Vidal Island Plantation Road, about 4.4 miles (7.1 km) northeast of Ferriday
- Nearest city: Ferriday, Louisiana
- Coordinates: 31°42′32″N 91°27′01″W
- Area: less than one acre
- Built: 1852
- Architectural style: Greek Revival
- NRHP reference No.: 79001057
- Added to NRHP: July 26, 1979

The Lisburn Plantation is a former cotton plantation with a historic mansion in Ferriday, Louisiana, U.S.. It was built in 1852, a decade prior to the American Civil War of 1861–1865.

The house has been listed on the National Register of Historic Places on July 26, 1979 and has been apparently moved from its 1977 location some time after its listing. (Note: Check satellite imagery with maps attached to NRHP registration)

== See also ==
- List of plantations in Louisiana
- National Register of Historic Places listings in Concordia Parish, Louisiana
