= National Register of Historic Places listings in Concordia Parish, Louisiana =

Location of Concordia Parish in Louisiana

This is a list of the National Register of Historic Places listings in Concordia Parish, Louisiana.

This is intended to be a complete list of the properties on the National Register of Historic Places in Concordia Parish, Louisiana, United States. The locations of National Register properties for which the latitude and longitude coordinates are included below, may be seen in a map.

There are 13 properties listed on the National Register in the parish. One property was once listed, but has since been removed.

This National Park Service list is complete through NPS recent listings posted December 19, 2025.

== Current listings ==
	Name on the Register	Image	Date listed	Location	City or town	Description
1	Canebrake	Canebrake	August 29, 1982 (#82002767)	Along Maxwell Road, about 2.9 miles (4.7 km) east of Spokane, Louisiana and about 9.7 miles (15.6 km) northeast of Ferriday; 31°41′56″N 91°24′41″W	Ferriday vicinity	
2	Concordia Parish Courthouse	Concordia Parish Courthouse	February 26, 2004 (#04000081)	405 Carter Street; 31°34′04″N 91°25′43″W	Vidalia	
3	DePrato Mounds	DePrato Mounds	October 22, 1998 (#98001258)	Address restricted	Ferriday vicinity	
4	Ferriday Commercial Historic District	Ferriday Commercial Historic District	January 27, 1995 (#94001584)	Roughly bounded by South 1st Street, Louisiana Avenue, South 3rd Street and Mickey Gilley Avenue; 31°37′46″N 91°33′10″W	Ferriday	
5	Frogmore (16CO9)	Frogmore (16CO9)	July 28, 2004 (#04000740)	Address restricted	Ferriday vicinity	
6	Gillespie	Gillespie	May 31, 1980 (#80001712)	Frogmore Plantation, 11656 US 84, about 7 miles (11 km) west of Ferriday; 31°36′24″N 91°40′07″W	Ferriday vicinity	Frogmore Plantation House
7	Killarney	Killarney	February 18, 1999 (#99000235)	Along LA 569, about 8 miles (13 km) northeast of Ferriday; 31°42′32″N 91°27′01″W	Ferriday vicinity	
8	Lisburn Plantation House	Lisburn Plantation House	July 26, 1979 (#79001057)	Along Vidal Island Plantation Road, about 4.4 miles (7.1 km) northeast of Ferriday; 31°40′16″N 91°29′50″W	Ferriday vicinity	
9	MAMIE S. BARRETT (towboat)	MAMIE S. BARRETT (towboat)	April 28, 1983 (#83002811)	On land at Deer Park; 31°24′48″N 91°34′40″W	Vidalia vicinity	Beached since the Great Flood of 1993
10	Piazza Cotton Gin	Piazza Cotton Gin	January 27, 1999 (#99000049)	Frogmore Plantation, 11656 US 84, about 7 miles (11 km) west of Ferriday; 31°36′21″N 91°40′10″W	Ferriday vicinity	
11	Roseland	Roseland	October 10, 1985 (#85003002)	916 Huntington Stadium Fisherman South Drive; 31°37′12″N 91°32′20″W	Ferriday vicinity	
12	Tacony Plantation House	Tacony Plantation House	April 19, 1979 (#79001059)	Along Taconey Plantation Road, about 450 yards (410 m) north of US 84; 31°34′50″N 91°28′26″W	Vidalia vicinity	
13	Zappe Boarding House	Zappe Boarding House	February 18, 1999 (#99000232)	107 Virginia Avenue; 31°37′59″N 91°33′07″W	Ferriday	

== Former listings ==
	Name on the Register	Image	Date listed	Date removed	Location	City or town	Description
1	Sheriff Eugene P. Campbell House	Sheriff Eugene P. Campbell House	April 13, 1979 (#79001058)	November 29, 2016	2 Concordia Avenue; 31°33′52″N 91°25′28″W	Vidalia	Destroyed by fire on January 20, 1991.

== See also ==
- List of National Historic Landmarks in Louisiana
- National Register of Historic Places listings in Louisiana
