= DePrato Mounds =

Archeological site

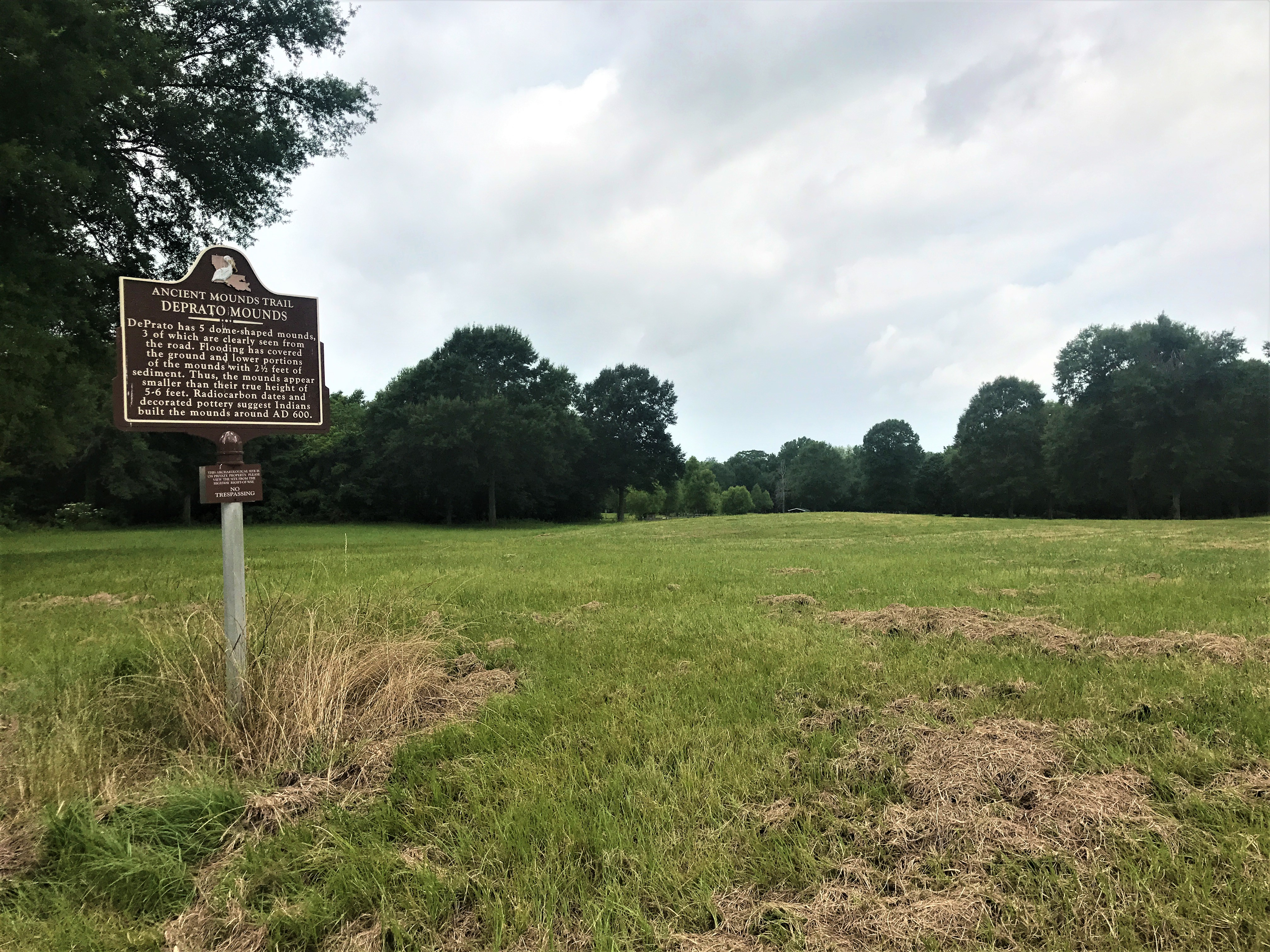

- Location within Louisiana today
- 31°37′35.29″N 91°34′35.23″W (Note: Location refer to the historic marker along U.S. Highway 84)
- Cultures: Troyville to Middle Coles Creek culture
- Location: Ferriday, Louisiana, Concordia Parish, Louisiana, USA
- Region: Concordia Parish, Louisiana

History
- Built: 400 CE
- Abandoned: 800 CE

- DePrato Mounds
- U.S. National Register of Historic Places
- Location: Address restricted
- Nearest city: Ferriday, Louisiana
- NRHP reference No.: 98001258
- Added to NRHP: October 22, 1998

DePrato Mounds (16 CO 37), also known as the Ferriday Mounds, is a multi-mound archaeological site located in Concordia Parish, Louisiana. The site shows occupation from the Troyville period to the Middle Coles Creek period (400 to 800 CE). The largest mound at the site has been dated by radiocarbon analysis and decorated pottery to about 600 CE.

The site was added to the National Register of Historic Places on October 22, 1998.

== Description ==
The site is a complex of five platform mounds and a central plaza area taking up about four acres of land to the east of the confluence of Black Bayou and Bayou Cocodrie. The mounds now appear smaller than they did in the past because extensive flooding in the centuries since their construction has deposited 3 feet (0.91 m) of sediment over the base of the mounds and the plaza.

The largest remaining mound, Mound C, has a base measuring 82 feet (25 m) by 66 feet (20 m) and is about 6 feet (1.8 m) in height. Mound D was demolished to provide fill for a highway construction project. Mound E was built on as the site of a private house. During excavations, human remains were found in three of the mounds. The site has been purchased by The Archaeological Conservancy, a nonprofit organization that plans to protect the site from future degradation.

== See also ==
- Frogmore Mound Site
- Troyville Mounds
- Culture, phase, and chronological table for the Mississippi Valley
- National Register of Historic Places listings in Concordia Parish, Louisiana
