= Vidalia High School =

Vidalia High School may refer to:

- Vidalia Comprehensive High School in Vidalia, Georgia
- Vidalia High School (Louisiana) in Vidalia, Louisiana
