= Keith Woodside =

American gridiron football player (born 1964)

No. 33, 23, 31
- Position: Running back

Personal information
- Born: July 29, 1964 (age 62); Natchez, Mississippi, U.S.
- Listed height: 5 ft 11 in (1.80 m)
- Listed weight: 203 lb (92 kg)

Career information
- High school: Vidalia (LA)
- College: Texas A&M
- NFL draft: 1988: 3rd round, 61st overall pick

Career history
- Green Bay Packers (1988–1991); Dallas Cowboys (1992)*; Winnipeg Blue Bombers (1994–1995); Birmingham Barracudas (1995)
- * Offseason or practice squad member only

Awards and highlights
- 2× Second-team All-SWC (1986, 1987)

Career NFL statistics
- Rushing yards: 976
- Rushing average: 3.8
- Rushing touchdowns: 6
- Stats at Pro Football Reference

Keith A. Woodside (born July 29, 1964) is an American former professional football player who was a running back in the National Football League (NFL) and Canadian Football League (CFL). He played four seasons for the Green Bay Packers from 1988 to 1991 and then the Winnipeg Blue Bombers in 1994 and Birmingham Barracudas in 1995. He was selected by the Packers in the third round of the 1988 NFL draft.

== NFL career statistics ==
Legend
**Bold**	Career high

Year	Team	Games		Rushing					Receiving				
Year	Team	GP	GS	Att	Yds	Avg	Lng	TD	Rec	Yds	Avg	Lng	TD
1988	GNB	**16**	9	83	195	2.3	10	**3**	39	352	**9.0**	**49**	**2**
1989	GNB	**16**	**16**	46	273	**5.9**	**68**	1	**59**	**527**	8.9	33	0
1990	GNB	**16**	13	46	182	4.0	21	1	24	184	7.7	25	0
1991	GNB	**16**	12	**84**	**326**	3.9	29	1	22	185	8.4	28	0
Career		64	50	259	976	3.8	68	6	144	1,248	8.7	49	2
