= Concordia Parish School Board =

School district in Louisiana, United States

Coordinates: 31.5753°N 91.4699°W

Concordia Parish School Board is a school district headquartered in Concordia Parish, Louisiana, United States.

The district serves residents of Concordia Parish, i.e. Vidalia, Ferriday, Ridgecrest, and Monterey.

== School uniforms ==
The district requires all students to wear school uniforms.

== Schools ==
=== Pre-Kindergarten - 12 schools ===
- Monterey High School (Unincorporated area)
- Concordia Parish Academy of Math, Science, and Technology (Ridgecrest)

=== High schools ===
- Ferriday High School (Ferriday)
- Vidalia High School (Vidalia)

=== Junior high schools ===
- Ferriday Junior High School (Ferriday)
- Vidalia Junior High School (Vidalia)

=== Elementary schools ===
3 - 5

- Ferriday Upper Elementary School (Ferriday)
- Vidalia Upper Elementary School (Vidalia)

Pre-Kindergarten - 2

- Ferriday Lower Elementary School (Ferriday)
- Vidalia Lower Elementary School (Vidalia)

=== Alternative schools ===
- Concordia Education Center (Ferriday)
