= Zappe Boarding House =

- U.S. National Register of Historic Places
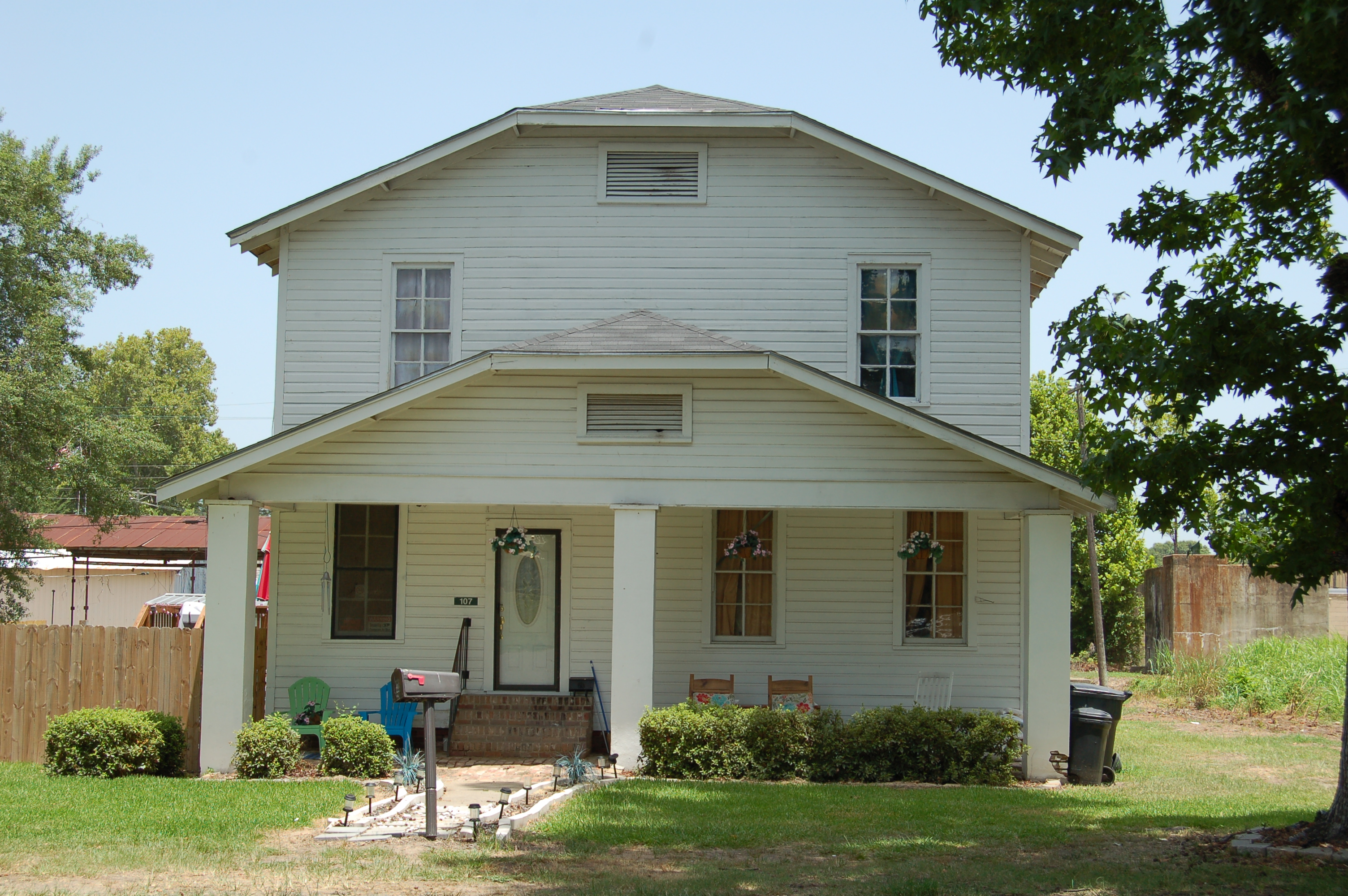

- Location within Louisiana Location within the United States
- Location: 107 Virginia Avenue; Ferriday, Louisiana
- Coordinates: 31°37′59″N 91°33′07″W
- Area: less than one acre
- Built: 1922
- Architectural style: Bungalow/Craftsman
- NRHP reference No.: 99000232
- Added to NRHP: February 18, 1999

The Zappe Boarding House, located at 107 Virginia Avenue in Ferriday, Louisiana was built in 1922 with some elements of Craftsman architecture. It's a two-story building near where railroad tracks used to run.

It was deemed significant as "one of few surviving buildings associated with Ferriday's very important railroad industry. The purpose of the building was to house railroad workers whose jobs called for an overnight layover in the town. It was built in 1922 for widow Alice Zappe after her engineer husband died as the result of a railroad accident."

The house was listed on the National Register of Historic Places on February 18, 1999.

== See also ==
- National Register of Historic Places listings in Concordia Parish, Louisiana
