= Walter Johnson (linebacker) =

American football player (born 1963)

No. 57, 90
- Position: Linebacker

Personal information
- Born: November 13, 1963 (age 62); Monroe, Louisiana, U.S.
- Listed height: 6 ft 0 in (1.83 m)
- Listed weight: 241 lb (109 kg)

Career information
- High school: Ferriday (LA)
- College: Louisiana Tech
- NFL draft: 1987: 2nd round, 46th overall pick

Career history
- Houston Oilers (1987–1988); New Orleans Saints (1989); Dallas Cowboys (1990)*; New Orleans Saints (1991)*; Indianapolis Colts (1991)*
- * Offseason or practice squad member only

Awards and highlights
- SLC Co-Defensive Player of the year (1986); SLC Newcomer of the Year (1983); 2× Division I-AA All-American (1985, 1986); 3× All-SLC (1984, 1985, 1986)

Career NFL statistics
- Games played: 41
- Stats at Pro Football Reference

Walter Ulysses Johnson (born November 13, 1963) is an American former professional football player who was a linebacker in the National Football League (NFL) for the Houston Oilers and New Orleans Saints. He played college football for the Louisiana Tech Bulldogs.

== Early life ==
Johnson attended Ferriday High School, where he was a defensive end. He also practiced basketball and track. He accepted a football scholarship from Louisiana Tech University.

As a sophomore in 1984, he registered 76 tackles, 11 sacks and 2 blocked kicks. He contributed to the team winning the Southland Conference and reaching the Division I-AA National championship game, where they lost 19–6 against Montana State University.

He blocked 4 kicks as a junior. He was moved from defensive end to outside linebacker as a senior.

He started every game of his college career, finishing with 327 tackles, 38 sacks (school record), 23 pass break ups, 12 forced fumbles and 6 fumble recoveries.

In 2013, he was inducted into the Louisiana Tech University Athletic Hall of Fame. He also was named to the Louisiana Tech All-Century football team.

== Professional career ==
Johnson was selected by the Houston Oilers in the second round (46th overall) of the 1987 NFL draft. He was a backup at outside linebacker and special teams player for two seasons.

In 1989, he was signed as a Plan B free agent by the New Orleans Saints. He was a backup at outside linebacker behind Pat Swilling. He had 3 tackles and one blocked extra point.

In 1990, he signed as a Plan B free agent with the Dallas Cowboys, with the intention of playing him at defensive end. He was released on August 26.

In 1991, he signed as a free agent with the New Orleans Saints. He was released on August 26.

== Personal life ==
Johnson volunteers as an assistant football coach at Ferriday High School. He owns a convenience store.
