= Concordia Parish Courthouse =

- U.S. National Register of Historic Places
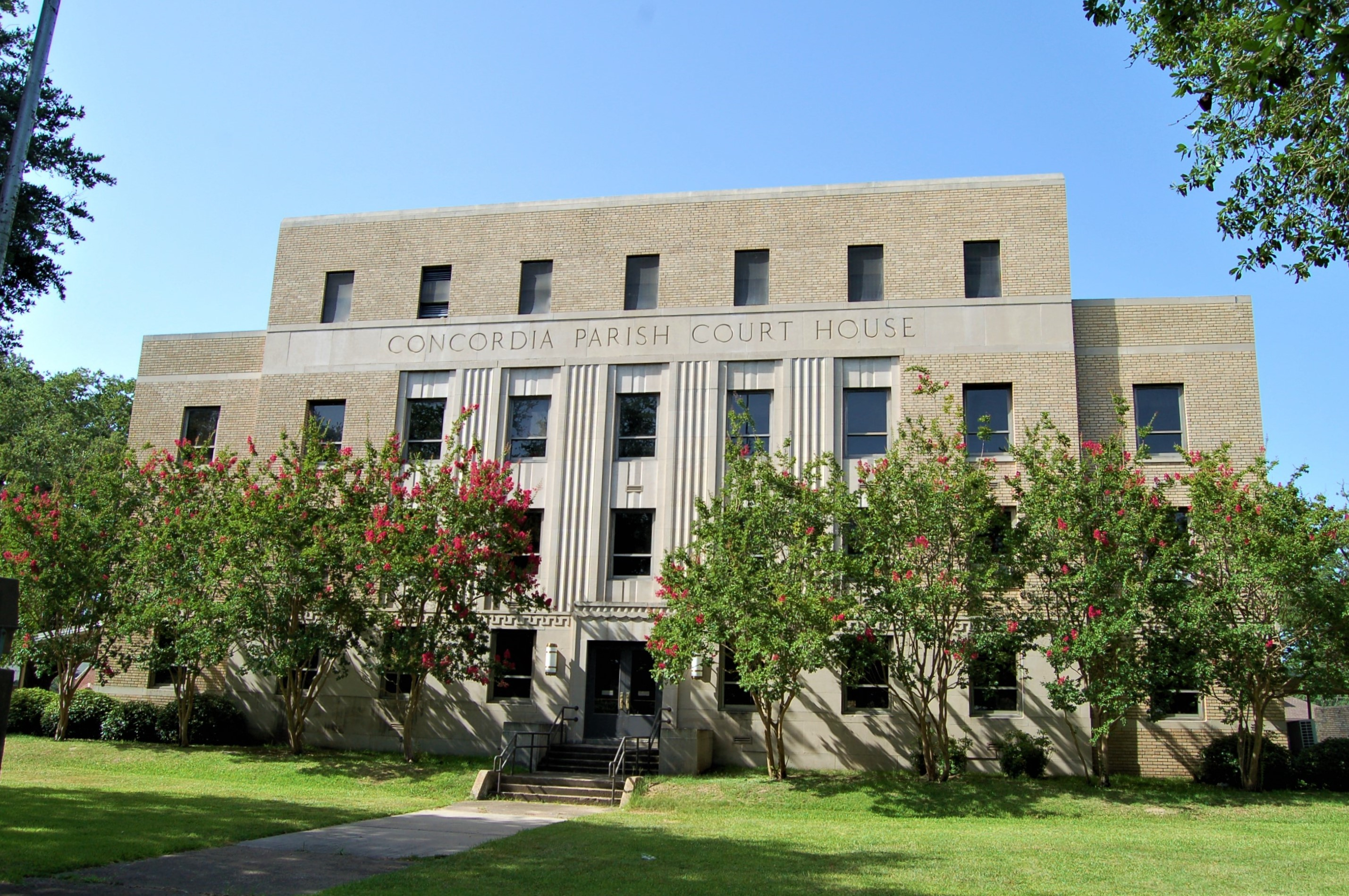

- Location within Louisiana Location within the United States
- Interactive map showing the location of Concordia Parish Courthouse
- Location: 405 Carter Street; Vidalia, Louisiana
- Coordinates: 31°34′04″N 91°25′43″W
- Area: 1.5 acres (0.61 ha)
- Built: 1939
- Built by: M.T. Reed Construction Company
- Architect: J.W. Smith and Associates
- Architectural style: Art Deco
- NRHP reference No.: 04000081
- Added to NRHP: February 26, 2004

The Concordia Parish Courthouse, at 405 Carter Street in Vidalia in Concordia Parish, Louisiana, was built in 1939. It was listed on the National Register of Historic Places in 2004.

The 1939 courthouse replaced an earlier one, demolished when, as part of a flood control project, the town of Vidalia was moved six blocks inland from the Mississippi River. It is a four-story brick and stone building with restrained Art Deco architecture. It has three-story wings on its sides and a small one-story wing on the rear. It was designed by J.W. Smith and Associates and was built by the M.T. Reed Construction Company.

The first floor originally was parish and school board offices, with the second and third floors used for courts and the fourth story used as a jail.

In 2019 the building is the Vidalia branch of Concordia Parish Library. The main entrance is what had been the courthouse's rear one, at 408 Texas Street.

== See also ==
- National Register of Historic Places listings in Concordia Parish, Louisiana
