= Frogmore and Sherford =

Civil parish in Devon, England

Coordinates: 50.28°N 3.72°W

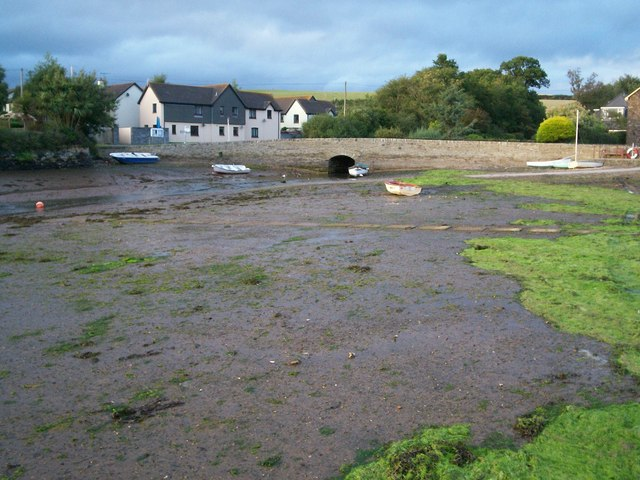
- Frogmore Creek with Frogmore in the background

- Location within Devon
- Population: 440 (2011 census)
- Civil parish: Frogmore and Sherford
- District: South Hams
- Shire county: Devon
- Region: South West
- Country: England
- Sovereign state: United Kingdom

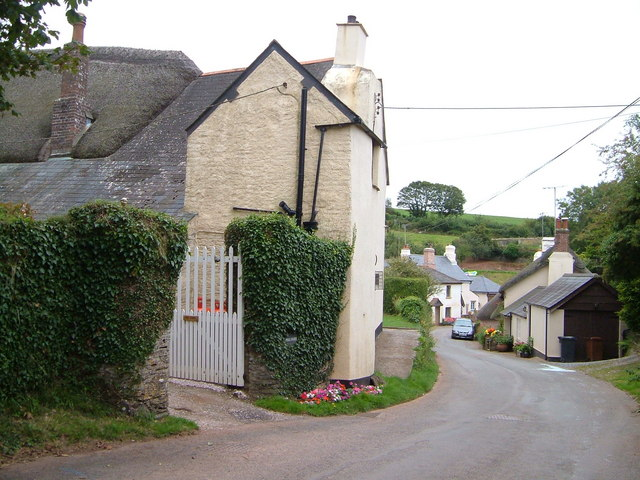
The village of Sherford.

Frogmore and Sherford is a civil parish in the South Hams district, in the county of Devon, England. Within it are the villages of Frogmore and Sherford. The parish was created in 1986 from Sherford and parts of South Pool and Charleton. In 2011 it had a population of 440.

== Description ==
It comprises the two villages of Frogmore and Sherford. Frogmore is at the head of a tidal creek of the Kingsbridge Estuary, and Sherford is one mile to the north.

Frogmore and Sherford is surrounded by the parishes of Kingsbridge to the west, Buckland-Tout-Saints to the northwest, East Allington to the north, Stokenham to the east, South Pool to the south and completely surrounds the parish of Charleton to the southwest.
