= Mamie S. Barrett (towboat) =

- U.S. National Register of Historic Places
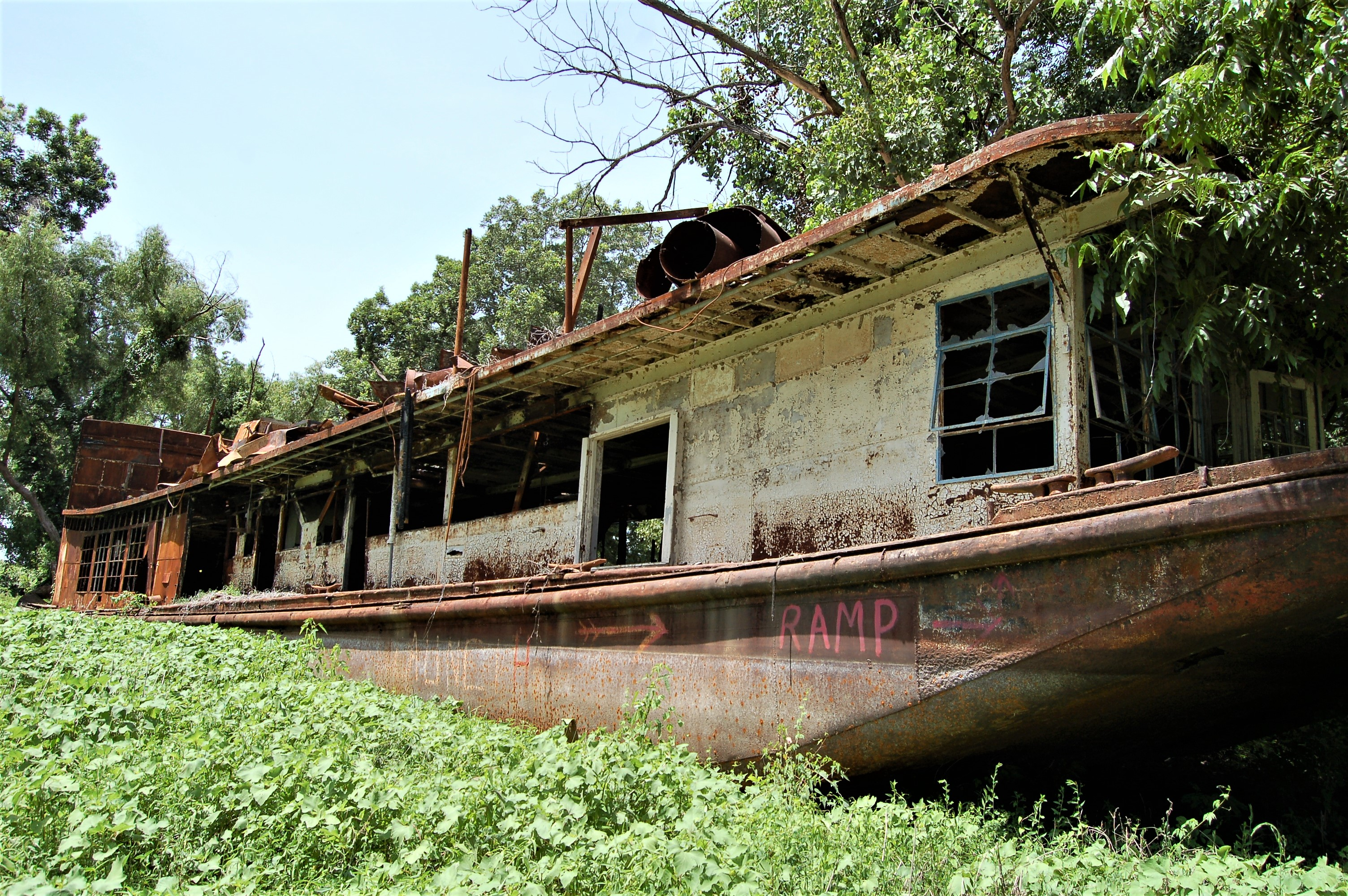

- Location within Louisiana Location within the United States
- Location: Deer Park, Vidalia, Louisiana
- Coordinates: 31°24′48″N 91°34′40″W
- Area: less than one acre
- Built: 1921
- Built by: Howard Brothers' Shipyard
- NRHP reference No.: 83002811
- Added to NRHP: April 28, 1983

Mamie S. Barrett, also known as Penniman and Piasa, was a historic towboat which was built in 1921. It was located in Eddy Creek Marina, in Eddyville, Kentucky at the time of its listing on the National Register of Historic Places in April 1983.

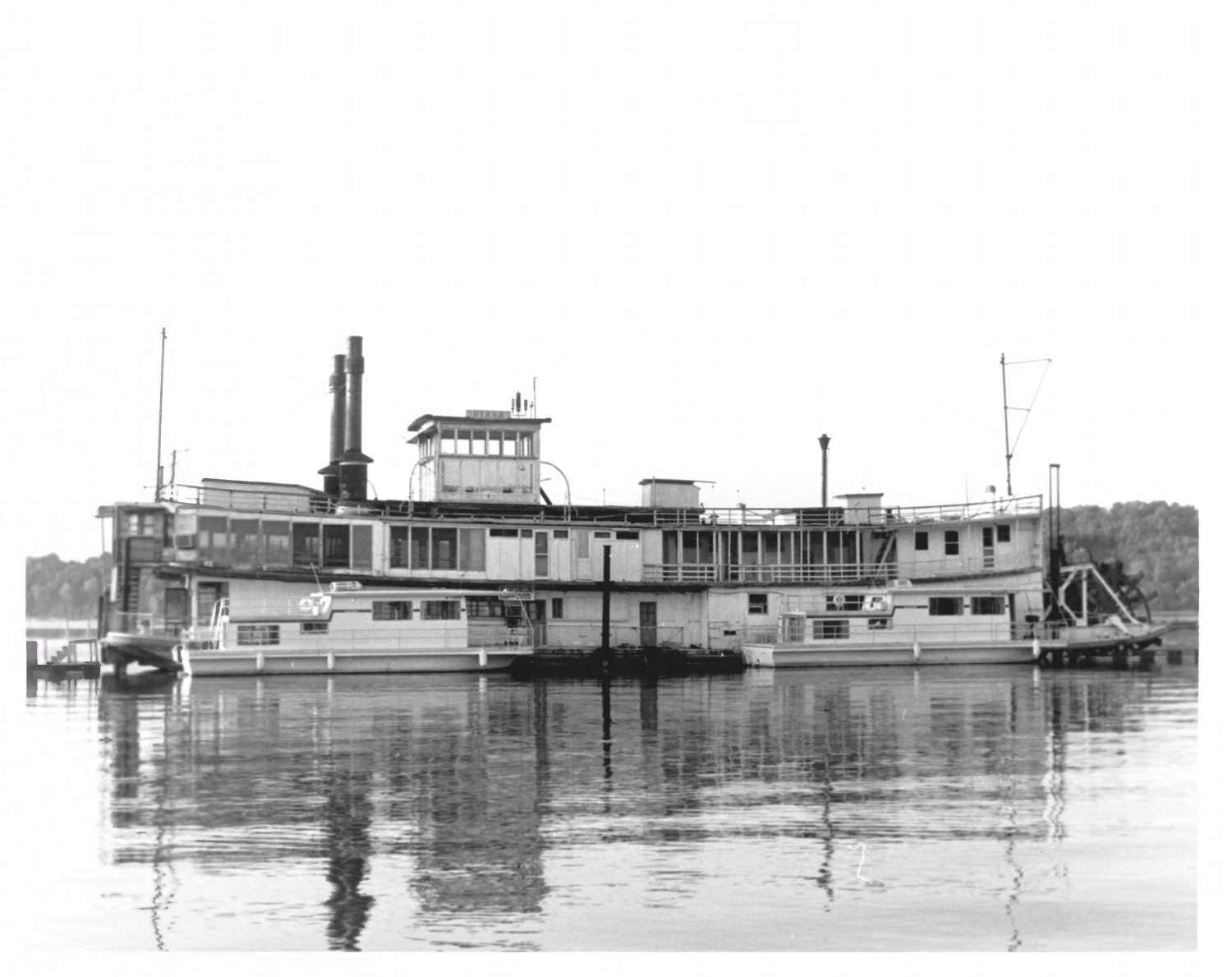
MAMIE S. BARRETT towboat) in 1982.

It was built in 1921 at the Howard Brothers' shipyard in Jeffersonville, Indiana at cost of $145,000 and was the flagship vessel for the Barrett Towboat and Barge Line Company. It was launched on August 11, 1921, and made its maiden voyage two weeks later.

The towboat was sold to the Army Corps of Engineers Office in Florence, Alabama in 1937 and renamed Penniman. In 1949, the towboat was bought by Lela and Spence Marshall, which renamed it Piasa, moved it at Harbor Point Yacht Club in West Alton, Missouri and operated it as a floating clubhouse. On October 20, 1981, the towboat was towed to Lake Barkley, Kentucky, where proprietors foamed the entire hull to prevent further deterioration, and planned to convert the boat to a first class restaurant and boutique.

In 1987, after being listed on the National Register of Historic Places, the boat was moved again to Vicksburg, Mississippi to be used as a showboat, and was outfitted with a theatre and a restaurant. In 1990 the boat was about to become a casino but never entered into exercise.

During the Great Flood of 1993 the boat was carried away and beached at its present location. In 2013 the rusty wreck was still located on land at Deer Park Vidalia in Concordia Parish, Louisiana. It was still beached in 2016 and in a state of great decay.

The wreck of Mamie S. Barrett was further damaged by fire in May 2017.

It is a 125 feet (38 m)-long "steel hulled sternwheel river towboat constructed with scow bow and steam engine rig." It is 30 feet (9.1 m) wide with draft of just 4 feet 7 inches.

== See also ==
- National Register of Historic Places listings in Concordia Parish, Louisiana
- National Register of Historic Places listings in Lyon County, Kentucky
