= Rutersville, Texas =

Unincorporated community in Texas, US

Coordinates: 29°56′52″N 96°47′50″W

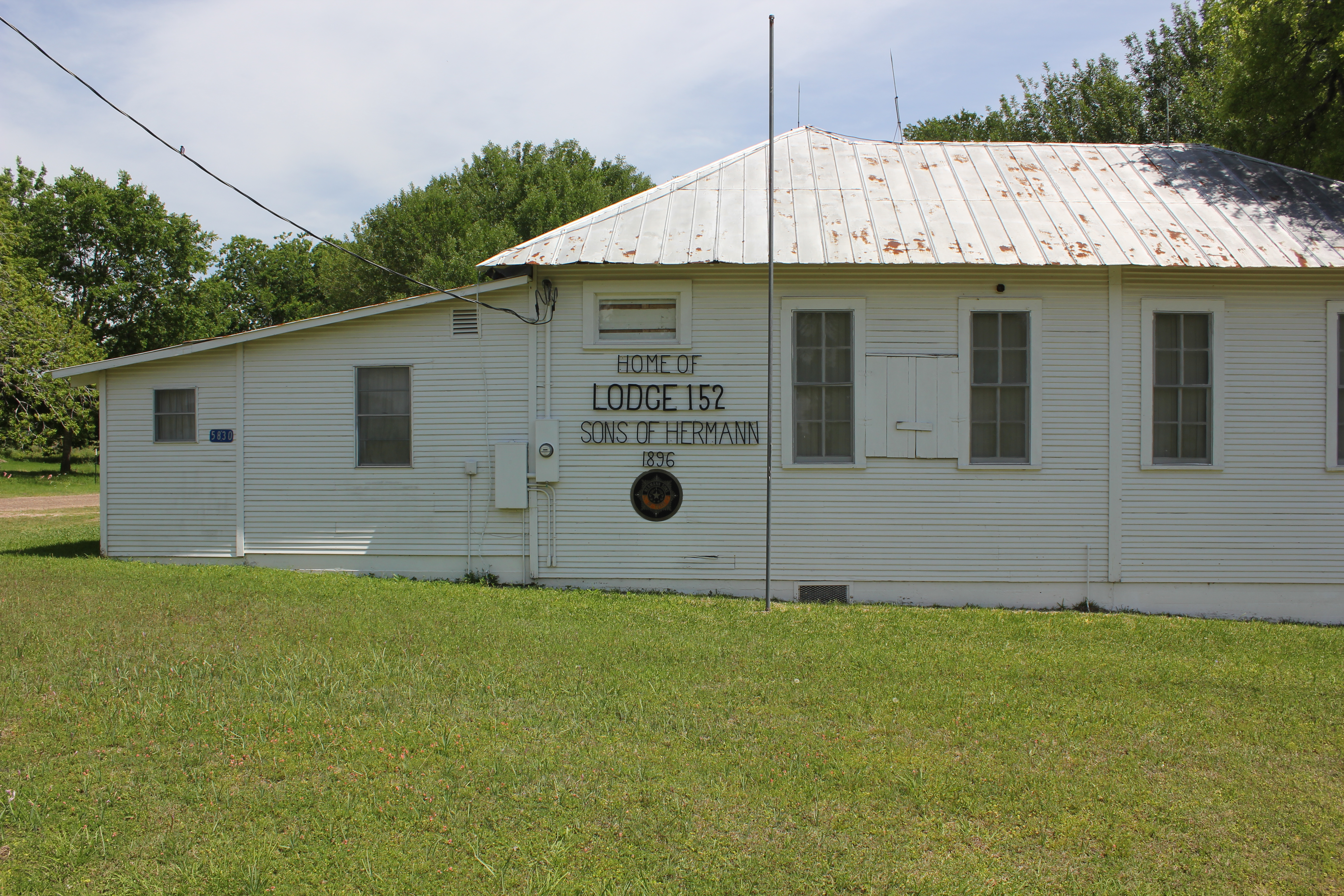
Sons of Hermann lodge

Rutersville is an unincorporated community in central Fayette County, Texas, United States. Rutersville College was located in the community during the mid-19th century, with Rutersville developing alongside the school. Both were named for Methodist missionary Martin Ruter, who had been instrumental in the college's founding before his death.

Robert and Mary Munger invented the Munger system of cotton ginning in the late 1870s. At the time, they were operating Robert's father's cotton gin in Rutersville.
