= National Register of Historic Places listings in Lyon County, Kentucky =

Location of Lyon County in Kentucky

This is a list of the National Register of Historic Places listings in Lyon County, Kentucky.

It is intended to be a complete list of the properties on the National Register of Historic Places in Lyon County, Kentucky, United States. The locations of National Register properties for which the latitude and longitude coordinates are included below, may be seen in a map.

There are 3 properties listed on the National Register in the county.

This National Park Service list is complete through NPS recent listings posted March 21, 2025.

== Current listings ==
| | Name on the Register | Image | Date listed | Location | City or town | Description |
|---|---|---|---|---|---|---|
| 1 | Kelly's Suwanee Furnace Office | | August 26, 1971 (#71000351) | Address Restricted | Kuttawa | |
| 2 | Old Eddyville Historic District | Old Eddyville Historic District | April 30, 1981 (#81000285) | Off Kentucky Route 730; 37°02′52″N 88°04′34″W | Eddyville | Includes the Kentucky State Penitentiary. |
| 3 | Whalen Site (125-Ly-48) | | January 27, 1983 (#83002812) | Address Restricted | Kuttawa | |

== Former listing ==
| | Name on the Register | Image | Date listed | Date removed | Location | City or town | Description |
|---|---|---|---|---|---|---|---|
| 1 | MAMIE S. BARRETT (towboat) | | April 28, 1983 (#83002811) | Formerly located in Eddy Creek Marina; 37°00′27″N 88°01′01″W | Formerly in Eddyville | Now located in Concordia Parish, Louisiana. | |

== See also ==
- List of National Historic Landmarks in Kentucky
- National Register of Historic Places listings in Kentucky
