= Ferriday Commercial Historic District =

Historic district in Louisiana, United States

- U.S. National Register of Historic Places
- U.S. Historic district
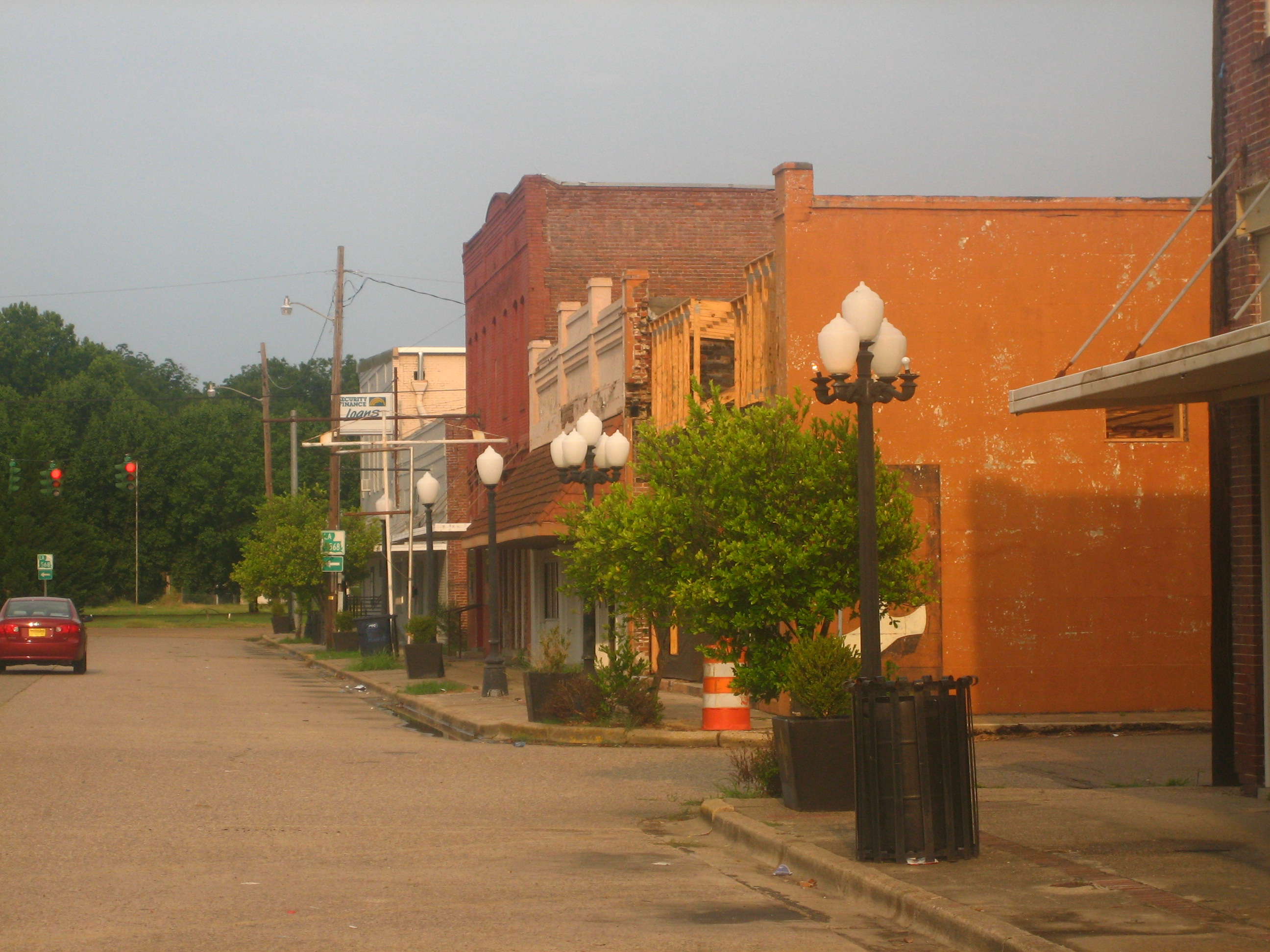
- Historic buildings on 100 block Louisiana Avenue.

- Location within Louisiana Location within the United States
- Location: Roughly bounded by South 1st Street, Louisiana Avenue, South 3rd Street and Mickey Gilley Avenue, Ferriday, Louisiana
- Coordinates: 31°37′46″N 91°33′10″W
- Area: 4 acres (1.6 ha)
- Architectural style: Italianate
- NRHP reference No.: 94001584
- Added to NRHP: January 27, 1995

The 'Ferriday Commercial Historic District in Ferriday, Louisiana is the historic portion of what was the only surviving commercial center in large but rural Concordia Parish. It was listed as a historic district on the National Register of Historic Places in 1995. The district included 21 buildings, all older than 50 years, as contributing buildings.

The buildings are one- and two-story masonry commercial buildings, within a two block area, and were built between c.1905 and c.1940.

One contributing building is the U.S. Post Office (1939), a one-story brick French Classical Revival building. It has false chimneys and arched windows. Its interior has Works Project Administration murals.

Three of the contributing buildings, the one at 909 South 2nd Street and two adjoining commercial buildings along South 1st Street, are no more existing and disappeared at some time after the district was created.

== Contributing properties ==
The historical district contains a total of 21 contributing properties, built c.1905 to c.1940:

- U.S. Post Office, now Louisiana Delta Music Museum, 218 Louisiana Avenue, 31°37′47″N 91°33′13″W, built 1939.
- Building at 210 Louisiana Avenue, 31°37′47″N 91°33′11″W, built 1923–1926.
- Building at 208 Louisiana Avenue, 31°37′47″N 91°33′11″W, built 1923–1926.
- Building at 204 Louisiana Avenue, 31°37′47″N 91°33′10″W, built 1923–1926.
- Vogt's Ferriday Drug Store, 200 Louisiana Avenue, 31°37′47″N 91°33′10″W, built before 1923.
- Building at 906 South 2nd Street, 31°37′46″N 91°33′10″W, built 1926–1938.
- Wilson's Printing, 902 South 2nd Street, 31°37′45″N 91°33′10″W, built 1926–1938.
- Building at 909 South 2nd Street, 31°37′46″N 91°33′09″W, built 1923–1926. No more existing.
- Building at 911 South 2nd Street, 31°37′46″N 91°33′09″W, built 1926–1938.
- Building at 913 South 2nd Street, 31°37′46″N 91°33′09″W, built 1923–1926.
- Building at 124-128 Louisiana Avenue, 31°37′47″N 91°33′09″W, built before 1923. Front quite altered from 1994 photo in NRHP form.
- Building at 120 Louisiana Avenue, 31°37′47″N 91°33′08″W, built before 1923.
- Concordia Drugs, 114-116 Louisiana Avenue, 31°37′47″N 91°33′08″W, built before 1923.
- Building #1 at 110 Louisiana Avenue, 31°37′47″N 91°33′07″W, built 1923–1926.
- Building #2 at 110 Louisiana Avenue, 31°37′47″N 91°33′07″W, built 1926–1938.
- Ferriday Dental Clinic, 104 Louisiana Avenue, 31°37′47″N 91°33′06″W, built before 1923.
- Commercial Building #1, 31°37′46″N 91°33′06″W, built 1923–1926. No more existing.
- Commercial Building #2, 31°37′46″N 91°33′06″W, built 1926–1938. No more existing.
- Commercial Building #3, 31°37′45″N 91°33′06″W, built c.1940.
- Commercial Building #4, 31°37′44″N 91°33′06″W, built 1923–1926.
- Myer Discount House, 31°37′43″N 91°33′06″W, built before 1923.

== See also ==
- National Register of Historic Places listings in Concordia Parish, Louisiana
