= Mack Moore =

American gridiron football player (born 1959)

Profile
- Position: Defensive end Defensive tackle

Personal information
- Born: March 4, 1959 (age 67); Monroe, Louisiana, U.S.
- Listed height: 6 ft 4 in (1.93 m)
- Listed weight: 258 lb (117 kg)

Career information
- High school: Ferriday (LA)
- College: Texas A&M
- NFL draft: 1981: 6th round, 152nd overall pick

Career history
- 1981–1984, 1988–1989: BC Lions
- 1985–1986: Miami Dolphins
- 1986: San Diego Chargers

Awards and highlights
- 2× CFL All-Star (1983, 1984)
- Stats at Pro Football Reference

Mack Henry Moore (born March 4, 1959) is a former National Football League (NFL) and Canadian Football League (CFL) defensive lineman. He played six seasons for the BC Lions and was a CFL All-Star twice.
