= Vidalia accola =

Scientific classification
- Kingdom: Animalia
- Phylum: Arthropoda
- Class: Insecta
- Order: Diptera
- Family: Tephritidae
- Genus: Vidalia
- Species: V. accola

Binomial name
- Vidalia accola (Hardy, 1973)

Species of fly

Vidalia accola is a species of tephritid or fruit flies in the genus Vidalia of the family Tephritidae.
