= Frogmore Mound Site =

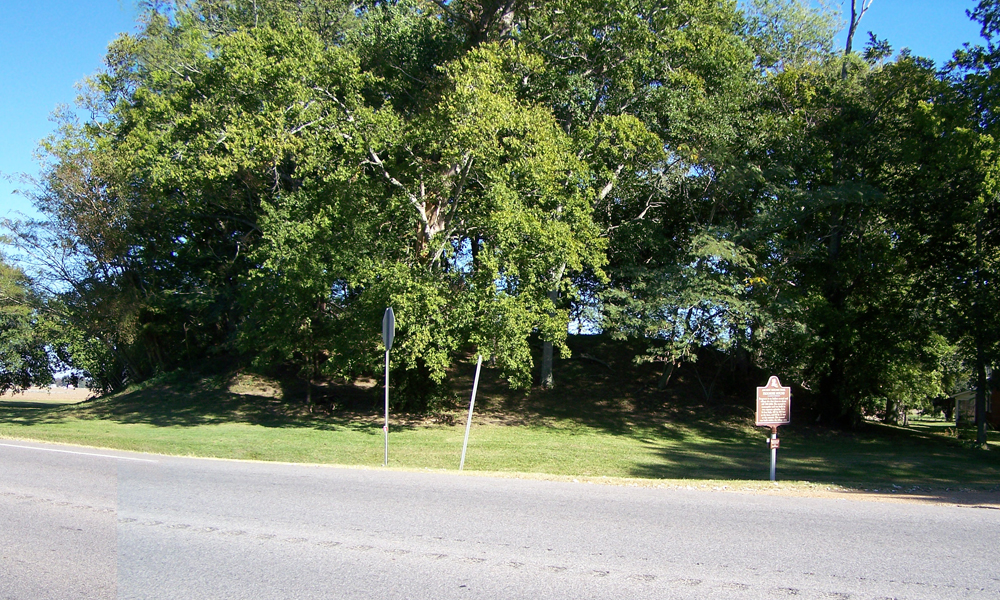
- Frogmore Mound as viewed from US 84

- Location within Louisiana today
- 31°36′17″N 91°40′15″W
- Cultures: Late Coles Creek culture
- Location: Ferriday, Louisiana, Concordia Parish, Louisiana, United States
- Region: Concordia Parish, Louisiana

History
- Built: 1020 CE
- Abandoned: 1260

Site notes
- Architectural style: earthwork

- Frogmore (16CO9)
- U.S. National Register of Historic Places
- Location: Address restricted
- Nearest city: Ferriday, Louisiana
- NRHP reference No.: 04000740
- Added to NRHP: July 28, 2004

Frogmore Mound Site (16 CO 9) is an archaeological site of the Late Coles Creek culture in Concordia Parish, Louisiana. The site is located 7 miles (11 km) west of Ferriday on US 84. It was added to the National Register of Historic Places on July 28, 2004.

== Description ==
The site consists of a platform mound and associated village area with middens covering an area roughly 400 feet (120 m) by 200 feet (61 m). The site originally had a walled ceremonial structure 20 feet (6.1 m) to 30 feet (9.1 m) in diameter. This structure was burned and subsequently covered with dirt. A mound, constructed in two stages very near each other chronologically, was built over top of the structure. The rectangular mound now measures 14 feet (4.3 m) in height, with the base being 160 feet (49 m) by 190 feet (58 m), and the summit 60 feet (18 m) by 70 feet (21 m).

Excavations at the site have produced charcoal from beneath the mound that dates to 1020–1260 CE. Pottery recovered from the midden places the occupation of the site to the Late Coles Creek period.

== Frogmore archeological site ==
As stated in NRHP registration form:

[This] is a single platform mound and village midden site that dates to the Ballina-Balmoral phases (ca. A.D. 900-1050) of the Coles Creek period (A.D. 700-1200) (Cusick et al. 1995). The site is adjacent to U. S. Highway 84 approximately 100 m south/southeast of the confluence of Otto Bayou and Brushy Bayou. It is set in a wetlands environment on a historic cotton plantation of the same name ... The mound is generally oriented to the cardinal directions, with the long axis running east-west. A buried village midden is on the north side of the mound.

The Frogmore site is next to an old meander scar of the Mississippi River and an abandoned channel of the Tensas River (Saucier 1994). The mound is constructed on Mississippi backswamp sediments that overlap point bar deposits of Mississippi Meaner Belt 2 that are between 4400-2400 years in age (Saucier 1994). Archaeologist James Ford speculated in 1936 that Frogmore was abandoned when the Tensas River shifted approximately 2 miles to the west, or to its present course (Ford 1936:238). Coles Creek ceramic types, the method of construction of a submound walled structure, and one radiocarbon date from the midden have established the age of the mound.

The site area is approximately 50 m x 80m. The long axis, composed of the mound and the village midden north of the mound, is oriented to the northeast and southwest. The platform mound is rectangular in plan view, measuring 5 m. The mound is constructed in two states and made with sandy and clay fill that covers a double walled circular structure and associated village midden.

== See also ==
- Culture, phase, and chronological table for the Mississippi Valley
- DePrato Mounds
- Frogmore Plantation
- Piazza Cotton Gin, also located in Frogmore Plantation
- National Register of Historic Places listings in Concordia Parish, Louisiana
