= Vidalia High School (Louisiana) =

Location
- 2201 Murray Drive; Vidalia, Louisiana 71373; United States; 31.57481°N 91.45403°W

Information
- School district: Concordia Parish School Board
- Principal: Allison Jowers
- Teaching staff: 29.70 (FTE)
- Grades: 9-12
- Enrollment: 424 (2023-2024)
- Student to teacher ratio: 14.28
- Colors: Blue, Red, and White
- Athletics: LHSAA 2A
- Athletics conference: District 2-2A
- Mascot: Viking
- Rival: Ferriday High School
- Website: www.cpsbla.us/o/vhs

Vidalia High School is a public school in Vidalia, Louisiana. The current enrollment is 427 students. The principal is Allison Jowers, since 2025.

== Athletics ==
Vidalia's sports teams, known as the Vikings, compete in Louisiana High School Athletic Association-sanctioned competition in class 2A.

=== Offered Athletics ===
Football

Baseball

Softball

Flag Football

Girls VolleyBall

Cheerleading

Dance Team

Marching Band

Color guard

=== Championships ===
Boys' Basketball Championship

- (1) 2010 (3A)

Baseball Championship

- (1) 1996 (2A)

Softball Championship

- (1) 2003 (2A)

== Notable alumni ==
- Jarrett Hoffpauir, former MLB player (St. Louis Cardinals, Toronto Blue Jays).
- Keith Woodside, former American Football player with the Green Bay Packers.
