= Frogmore, Pointe Coupee Parish, Louisiana =

Unincorporated community in Louisiana

Frogmore, Louisiana
- Unincorporated community
- Location within Louisiana Location within the United States
- Coordinates: 30°31′10″N 91°31′27″W
- Country: United States
- State: Louisiana
- Parish: Pointe Coupee
- Elevation: 26 ft (7.9 m)
- Time zone: UTC-6 (Central (CST))
  - Summer (DST): UTC-5 (CDT)
- Area code: 225
- GNIS feature ID: 543222

Frogmore is an unincorporated community in Pointe Coupee Parish, Louisiana, United States.
