= Magdaléna Zappe =

Austrian stage actress and dancer

Magdaléna Zappe (1757 – after 1819) was an Austrian stage actress and dancer. She is known as a member of the founding pioneer generation of the first Czech-language theater in Prague, the Vlastenské Theatre.

She was married to the Czech actor Antonín Zappe. She was engaged at the Ballet Court Theatre i Wien (1774–76) in the theater company of K. Wahr, which regularly performed in Salzburg, in Pressburg and in Pest (1776–79), and from 1779 in Prague; firstly in the ballet of the Estates Theatre (1779–86) and then at the newly founded pioneer Vlastenské Theatre, where she belonged to the first actors employed. As was not uncommon at the time, she was both a dancer as well as an actor. She played heroines, soubrette and mother-parts. While being of Austrian origin and somewhat criticized for her Austrian dialect, she performed both in Czech as well as in German.
