= Frogmore, Devon =

Village in Devon, England

Coordinates: 50°16′13″N 3°43′08″W

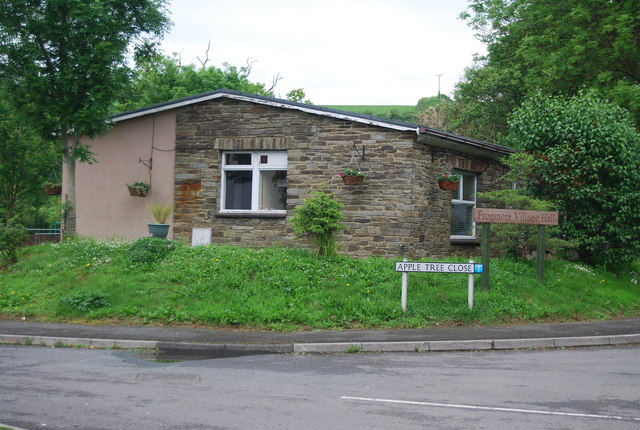
Frogmore village hall

Frogmore is a village in the civil parish of Frogmore and Sherford in the South Hams district of the county of Devon, England.

The origin of the place-name is from the Old English words frogga and mere meaning pool frequented by frogs.

The village is located at the head of Frogmore Creek, an arm of the Kingsbridge Estuary. It was once a small and thriving port, but is now more popular with tourists and horses.

A regatta is held every year in August; there is a village hall, one pub and a traditional bakery.
