= Robert S. Munger =

American business executive and inventor (b. 1854, d. 1923)

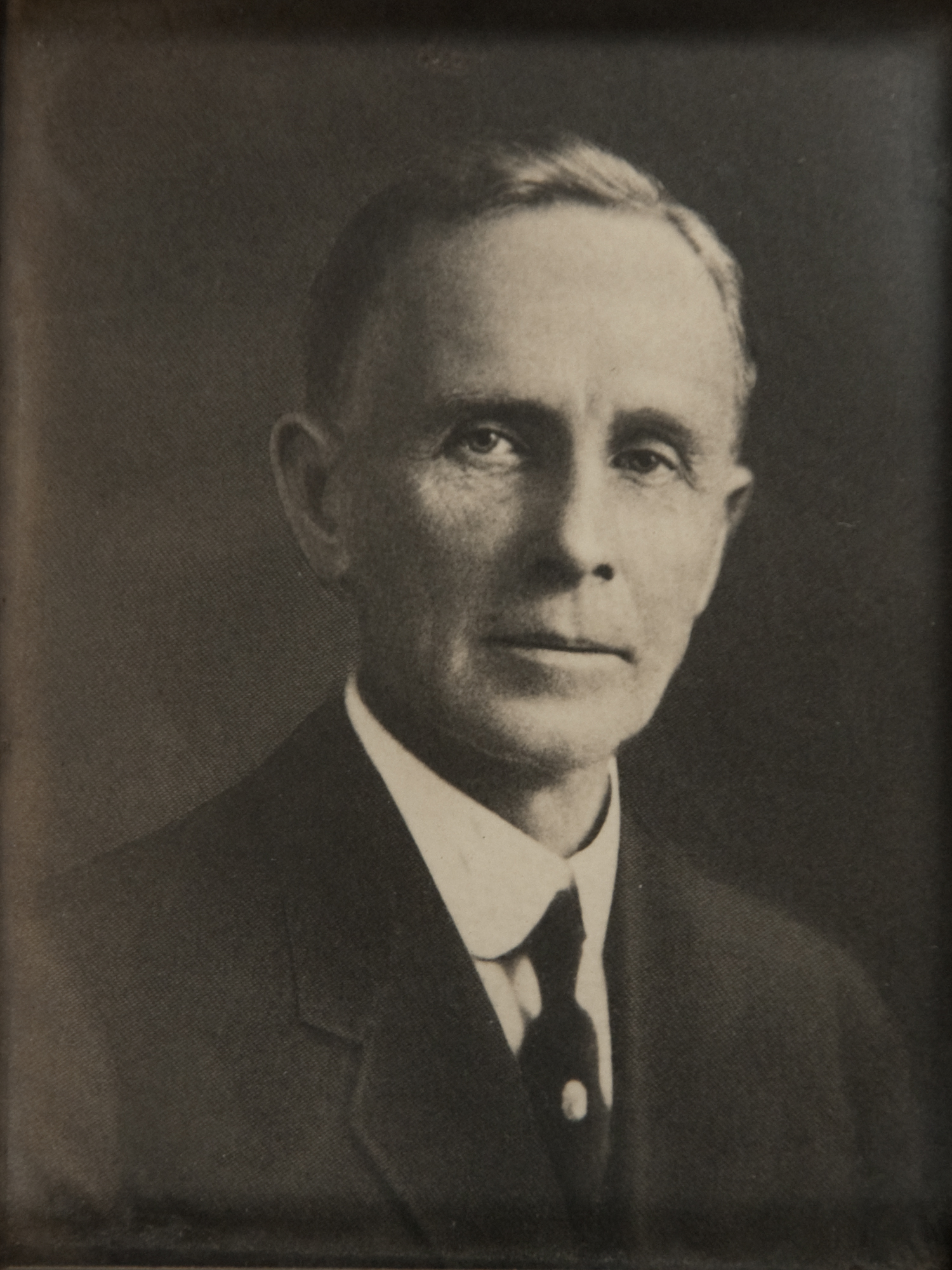
- Born: Robert Sylvester Munger; July 24, 1854; Rutersville, Texas, U.S.
- Died: April 20, 1923 (aged 68); Birmingham, Alabama, U.S.
- Occupations: Businessman; Inventor; Philanthropist; Entrepreneur

Robert Sylvester Munger (July 24, 1854 – April 20, 1923) and his wife Mary Collett Munger (1857–1924) invented the "system cotton gin". Munger later started and ran some of the largest gin manufacturing companies in the United States. He also developed real estate in Dallas, Texas. Munger was also a philanthropist who supported causes in the Birmingham, Alabama area.

== Early life ==
Robert Sylvester Munger was born in Rutersville, Texas on July 24, 1854. His father, Henry Martin Munger, ran a sawmill and cotton gin there, and his boyhood included working in those enterprises. Robert later studied Latin and Law at Trinity University in Tehuacana, Texas. However his studies were interrupted when his father called him back home to run the cotton gin.

== System cotton gin ==
For a decade and a half after 1865, the end of the Civil War, a number of innovative features became widely used for ginning in the United States. They included steam power instead of animal power, an automatic feeder to assure that the gin stand ran smoothly, a condenser to make the clean cotton coming out of the gin easier to handle, and indoor presses so that cotton no longer had to be carried across the gin yard to be baled. Then, in 1879, while he was running his father's gin in Rutersville, Robert Munger invented additional system ginning techniques. Robert and his wife, Mary Collett, later moved to Mexia, Texas, built a system gin, and obtained related patents.

The Munger System Ginning Outfit (or system gin) integrated all the ginning operation machinery, thus assuring the cotton would flow through the machines smoothly. Such system gins use air to move cotton from machine to machine. Robert's motivation for his inventions included improving employee working conditions in the gin. However, the selling point for most gin owners was the accompanying cost savings while producing cotton both more speedily and of higher quality.

By the 1960s, many other advances had been made in ginning machinery, but the manner in which cotton flowed through the gin machinery continued to be the Munger system.

Economic Historian William H. Phillips referred to the development of system ginning as "The Munger Revolution" in cotton ginning. He wrote,

[The Munger] innovations were the culmination of what geographer Charles S. Aiken has termed the"second ginning revolution", in which the privately owned plantation gins were replaced by large-scale public ginneries. This revolution, in turn, led to a major restructuring of the cotton gin industry, as the small, scattered gin factories and shops of the nineteenth century gave way to a dwindling number of large twentieth-century corporations designing and constructing entire ginning operations.

=== Gin manufacturing ===
Munger approached several gin manufacturers, but they were not interested in making his system gin. As a result, in 1884, the family moved to Dallas, where the Mungers built their own factory. In 1887, other investors joined them under the name Munger Improved Cotton Machine Manufacturing Company. The Munger children, as well as Munger's brother Ennis, served as executives. The company's sales increased rapidly west of the Mississippi River. In 1890, Munger moved to Birmingham, Alabama to build a factory there to avoid freight charges to the east and to meet increasing demand. Munger's brother, Stephen, stayed behind as president of the Dallas operation. With additional investors, the Birmingham factory became the Northington-Munger-Pratt Company, which became the largest producer of cotton ginning machinery east of the Mississippi.

In 1899, the Mungers' companies merged with several of the other large U.S. gin manufacturers. Initially, Robert and Stephen were vice-presidents of the newly formed Continental Gin Company in Birmingham. The company continued to be a major gin manufacturer, and various Mungers held a large portion of the company's executive positions for the next quarter-century. The Munger family's substantial involvement ended in 1926, two years after the death of Robert and Mary Collett. At that point, a group of investors led by Ernest Woodruff of Atlanta bought a controlling interest in Continental Gin. One of Munger's sons, Eugene, stayed on in executive roles at least until 1939.

=== Surviving examples ===
A few early system cotton gins survive. Examples include:

- Burton Farmers Gin, Texas Cotton Gin Museum, Burton Texas
- Georgia Museum of Agriculture & Historic Village, Tifton Georgia
- Gin Barn, Magnolia Plantation, Louisiana
- Louisiana State Cotton Museum, Lake Providence Louisiana
- Old Alabama Town, Montgomery Alabama
- Piazza Gin, Frogmore Plantation Louisiana
- Plantation Agriculture Museum, Scott Arkansas

== Real estate ==
In the early 1900s, Munger conceived and promoted Munger Place, a fifty-block subdivision in Dallas Texas. Robert's son, Collett H. Munger, managed the development. The subdivision employed deed restrictions, a common practice in the United States today, but considered innovative at the time. Munger's deed restrictions were exclusive in nature. In particular, deeds for lots near Swiss Avenue required the houses to be so expensive that only the most wealthy of Dallas residents could afford them. Portions of the original subdivision were listed on the National Register of Historic Places as Swiss Avenue Historic District in 1974 and as Munger Place Historic District in 1978.

== Philanthropy ==
In his later years, Birmingham newspapers recognized the Mungers' extensive philanthropies. A newspaper article at the time of his death listed several institutions they supported substantially: Birmingham–Southern College, Highlands Methodist Church, Walker Memorial Church, and the Birmingham and Houston YMCAs. The article also emphasized the Mungers' contributions to African-American institutions: Central Alabama College, Miles Memorial College, and various Birmingham churches. The article reported: "There isn't a negro church in Birmingham to which he has not contributed." It also mentioned donations to "the suffering people of Europe." The Mungers also supported several universities, such as Southern Methodist University in Dallas.

== Later life ==
Munger married Mary Collett of Fairfield, Texas, the daughter of Captain James Hamilton Collett of North Carolina and Margaret Ann Davis of Alabama, in 1878. Robert and Mary Collett had nine children, eight of whom lived into adulthood.

Munger and Mary Collett moved to Birmingham and into the Mirabeau Swanson House in the Five Points South neighborhood in 1889. In 1902, the family moved again, now outside of town to Arlington, an antebellum home that briefly had housed the headquarters of Union General James H. Wilson late in the Civil War.

Munger believed in the importance of exercise for all, among other things teaching his children to ride bicycles at very young ages.

Munger's fascination with wheels for transportation attracted him to automobiles when autos began replacing the horse and buggy. The family purchased its first automobile soon after moving to Birmingham and often traveled by car. They bought a Winton in 1902, followed by 14 hp and 24 hp Packards, and a 1903 Winton. In 1904, Munger acquired a Panhard-Levassor in London and used it to help pioneer United States automotive travel. His personal day books record many adventuresome auto trips at home and abroad.

After playing 18 holes of golf on April 7, 1923, Munger became ill with pneumonia. He died on April 20, 1923.

== Other ==
Historian Dr. Carolyn Green Satterfield included three chapters on the Munger family in Arlington, Birmingham's Historic House, which she edited for The Arlington Historical Association in 2010.

In September 2018, Munger was inducted into the Alabama Men's Hall of Fame. The Alabama Men's Hall of Fame was established by an act of the Alabama state legislature in 1987 to parallel the Alabama Women's Hall of Fame. Its mission is "to recognize those men native to or identified most closely with the State of Alabama who have made significant contributions on a state, national, or international scale within their professional field."
