= Frogmore, Concordia Parish, Louisiana =

Frogmore, Louisiana
- Unincorporated community
- Location within Louisiana Location within the United States
- Coordinates: 31°36′12″N 91°40′13″W
- Country: United States
- State: Louisiana
- Parish: Concordia
- Elevation: 59 ft (18 m)
- Time zone: UTC-6 (Central (CST))
  - Summer (DST): UTC-5 (CDT)
- Area code: 318
- GNIS feature ID: 535133

Frogmore is an unincorporated community in Concordia Parish, Louisiana, United States.
