= Ferriday High School =

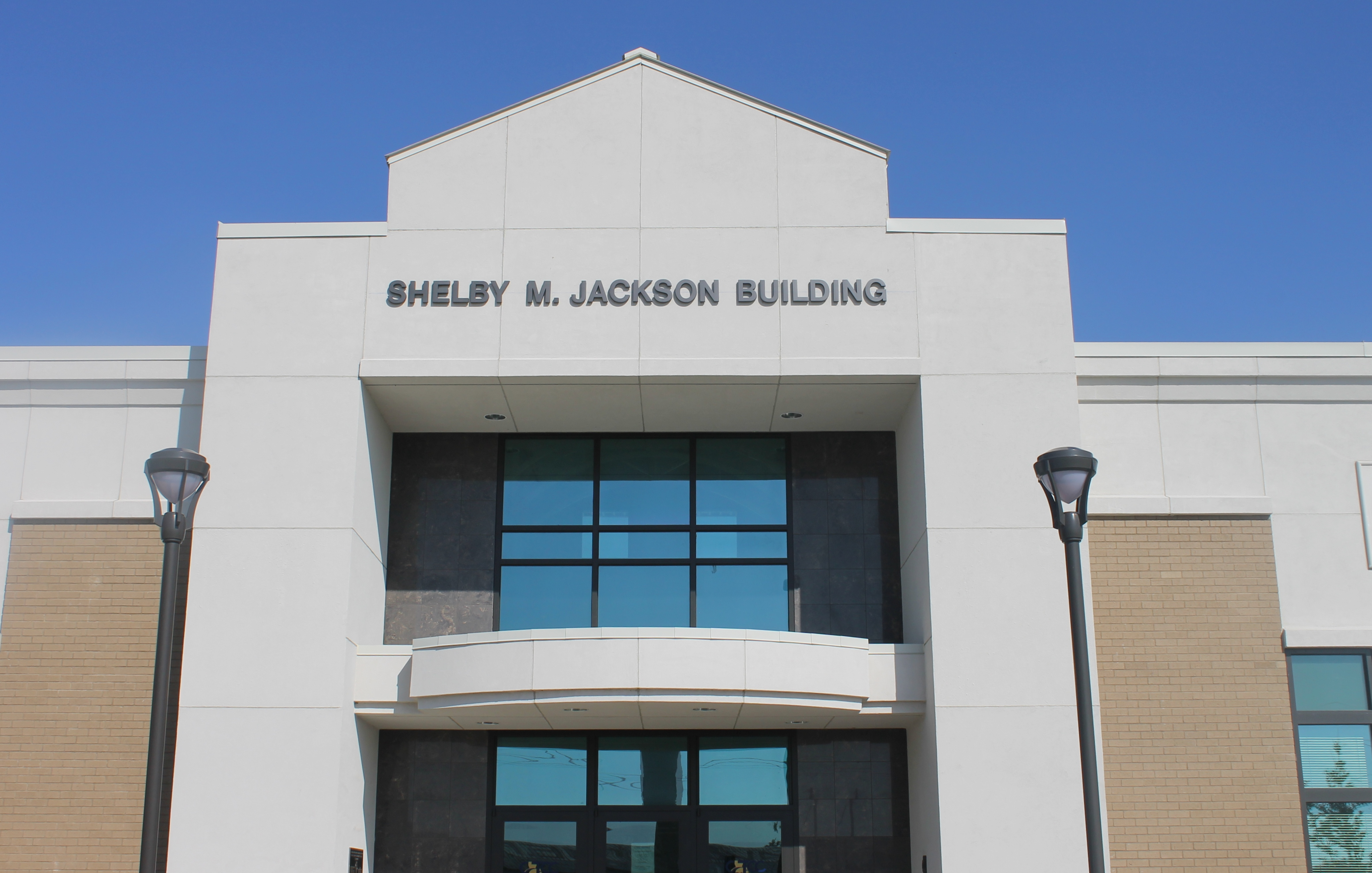

Location
- 801 EE Wallace Boulevard; Ferriday, Louisiana 71334; United States; 31.6379°N 91.5539°W

Information
- Type: Public high school
- School district: Concordia Parish School Board
- Superintendent: Whest Shirley
- Principal: Kimberly M. Jackson
- Staff: 28.74 (FTE)
- Grades: 9-12
- Enrollment: 310 (2023-2024)
- Student to teacher ratio: 10.79
- Colors: Black and gold
- Team name: Trojans
- Yearbook: Melzier
- Website: www.cpsbla.us/o/fhs

Ferriday High School is a public high school in Ferriday, Louisiana, United States. It is one of three high schools run by the Concordia Parish School Board.

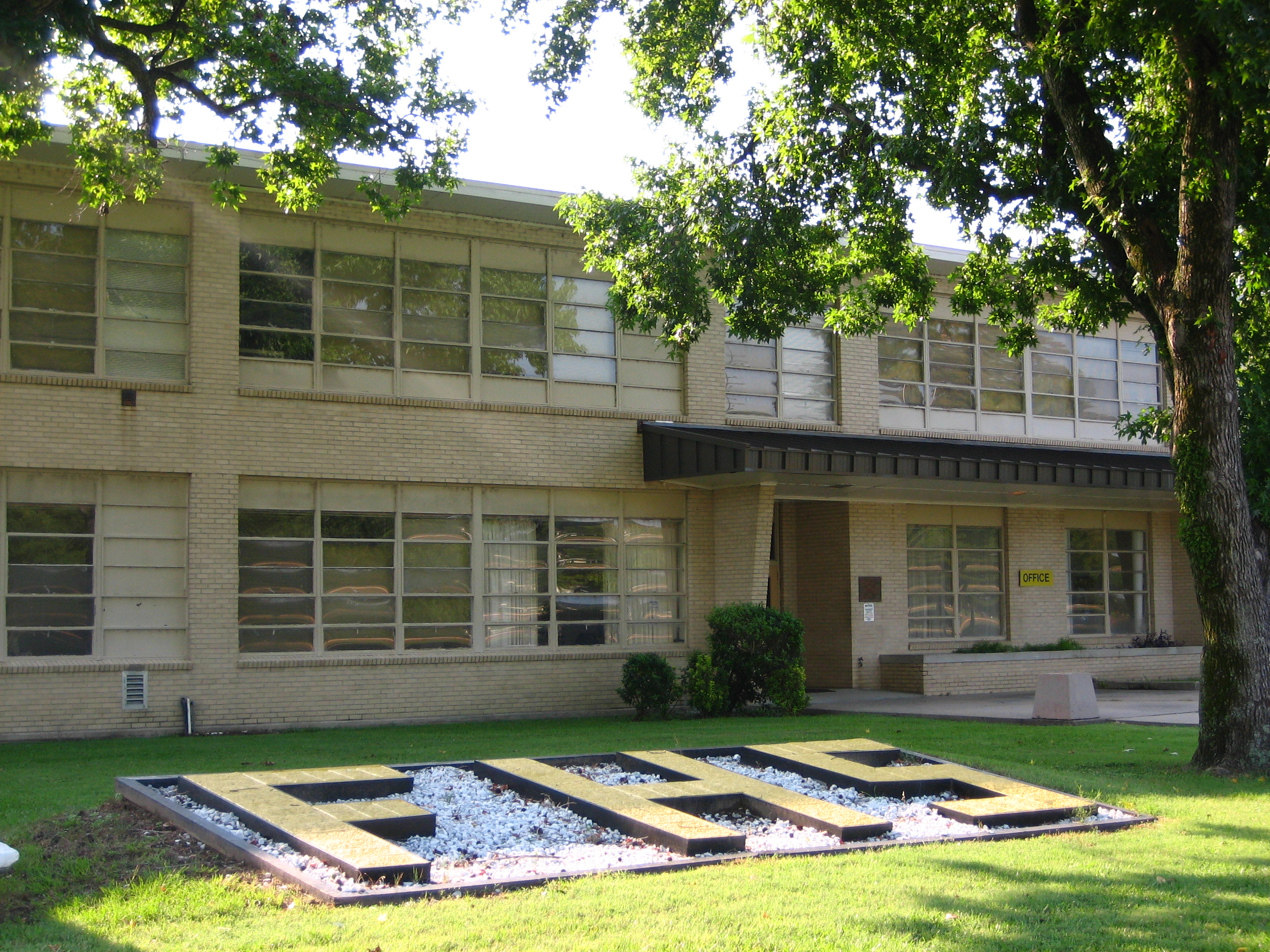
Front Entrance

== Student life ==
Clubs and activities offered at Ferriday include:

- 4-H Club
- Beta Club
- Future Business Leaders of America
- General Cooperative Education
- Glee Club
- Library Club
- Marching Band
- Student Council
- Trail Blazers

== Athletics ==
Ferriday High athletics competes in the LHSAA.

The following sports are offered at Ferriday:

- Basketball (Co-ed)
- Cheerleading (Girls)
- Football (Boys)
- Track (Co-ed)
- Marching Band (Co-ed)

=== Championships ===
Football championships

- (5) State Championships: 1953, 1954, 1955, 1956, 2019

Ferriday has a long history of success in football. They won four straight state championships from 1953 to 1956 and had a combined record of 52-1-2 in those four years.

== Demographics ==
As of 2018, 98.2% of the student population at Ferriday High School are African-American, making up the majority of the student body. 1.8% are Caucasian. According to the 2000 U.S. Census, 70.2% of Ferriday's students live at or below the poverty line. More than 75% of students receive free or reduced lunch.

== Notable alumni ==
- Bob Barber, former NFL player
- Walter Johnson, former NFL player
- Mack Moore, former NFL and CFL player
