= Vidalia (fly) =

Scientific classification
- Domain: Eukaryota
- Kingdom: Animalia
- Phylum: Arthropoda
- Class: Insecta
- Order: Diptera
- Family: Tephritidae
- Subfamily: Trypetinae
- Tribe: Trypetini
- Genus: Vidalia; Robineau-Desvoidy, 1830

Type species
- Vidalia impressifrons Robineau-Desvoidy, 1830

Synonyms
- Pseudina Malloch, 1939; Sinaida Hering, 1940

Genus of flies

Vidalia is a genus of tephritid or fruit flies in the family Tephritidae. Vidalia are commonly found distributed from the Eastern Palearctic to Oriental and Australasian. They breed in the fruits of Heptapleurum oxyphyllum var. oxyphyllum, a member of family Araliaceae, in West Malaysia.

== Species ==
- Vidalia accola (Hardy, 1973)
- Vidalia armifrons (Portschinsky, 1891)
- Vidalia bicolor Hardy, 1987
- Vidalia bidens Hendel, 1915
- Vidalia buloloae (Malloch, 1939)
- Vidalia ceratophora Bezzi, 1913
- Vidalia diffluata Hering, 1938
- Vidalia dualis Permkam & Hancock, 1995
- Vidalia duplicata (Han & Wang, 1994)
- Vidalia eritima (Han & Wang, 1994)
- Vidalia fletcheri Munro, 1938
- Vidalia furialis Ito, 1984
- Vidalia himalayensis (Bezzi, 1913)
- Vidalia imbellis Ito, 2011
- Vidalia impressifrons Robineau-Desvoidy, 1830
- Vidalia kijanga Chua & Ooi, 1997
- Vidalia langatensis Chua, 2000
- Vidalia placabilis Ito, 2011
- Vidalia spadix Chen, 1948
- Vidalia thailandica Hancock & Drew, 1994
- Vidalia tuberculata Hardy, 1970
