= Ferriday, Louisiana =

Town in Concordia Parish

- Sole incorporated city
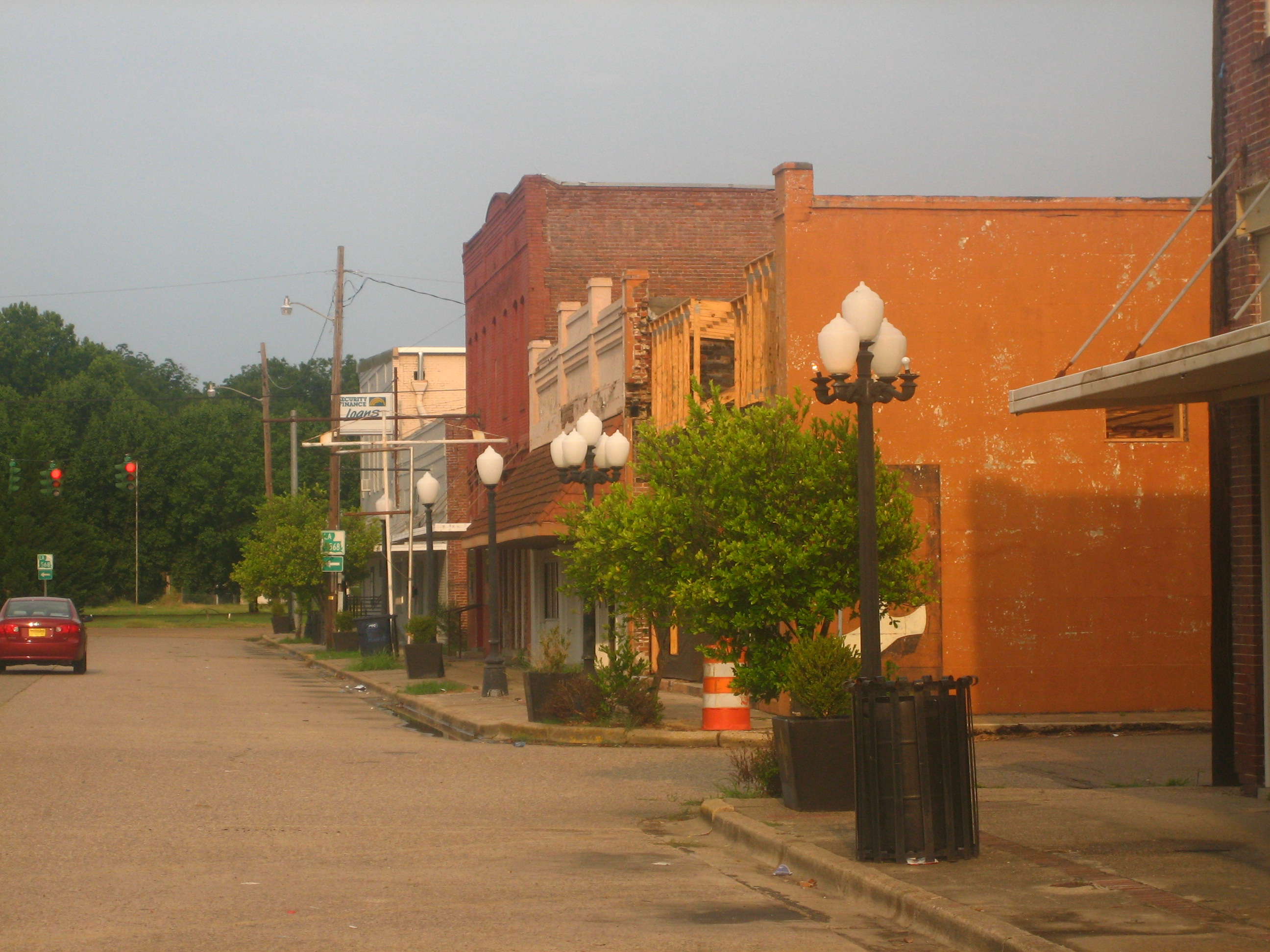
- Downtown Ferriday

- Location of Ferriday in Concordia Parish, Louisiana.

- Location of Ferriday in Louisiana Location of Ferriday in the United States
- Coordinates: 31°37′50″N 91°33′24″W
- Country: United States
- State: Louisiana
- Parish: Concordia

Government
  - Mayor: Sherrie Jacobs

Area
  - Total: 1.63 sq mi (4.22 km^{2})
  - Land: 1.63 sq mi (4.22 km^{2})
  - Water: 0 sq mi (0.00 km^{2})
- Elevation: 52 ft (16 m)

Population (2020)
  - Total: 3,189
  - Density: 1,957.4/sq mi (755.74/km^{2})
- Time zone: UTC-6 (CST)
  - Summer (DST): UTC-5 (CDT)
- ZIP codes: 71334
- Area code: 318
- FIPS code: 22-25440

Ferriday is a town in Concordia Parish, which borders the Mississippi River and is located on the central eastern border of Louisiana, United States. As of the 2020 census, Ferriday had a population of 3,189. It is an African-American majority town.

The town claims to have produced more famous people per square mile than any other in America. Elaine Dundy explored both celebrities and townsfolk in her book, Ferriday, Louisiana, published by E. P. Dutton in 1991.

Churches of several major denominations are located here, including a large Pentecostal congregation south of town on Louisiana Highway 15, as well as Baptist, Assembly of God, Presbyterian, Methodist, and Catholic.

== Geography ==
Ferriday is situated on the west side of Lake Concordia and 8 miles (13 km) from Lake St. John, oxbow lakes noted for recreational and professional bass fishing.

U.S. Routes 84 and 425 pass through the center of Ferriday. US 84 leads west 16 miles (26 km) to Jonesville, and US 425 leads north 6 miles (10 km) to Clayton. The two highways jointly lead southeast 11 miles (18 km) to Natchez, Mississippi.

According to the United States Census Bureau, Ferriday has a total area of 1.6 square miles (4.2 km^{2}), all being land.

=== Climate ===
Climate data for Ferriday, Louisiana
Month	Jan	Feb	Mar	Apr	May	Jun	Jul	Aug	Sep	Oct	Nov	Dec	Year
Record high °F (°C)	83 (28)	85 (29)	91 (33)	92 (33)	99 (37)	102 (39)	102 (39)	105 (41)	103 (39)	98 (37)	87 (31)	83 (28)	105 (41)
Mean daily maximum °F (°C)	57 (14)	63 (17)	70 (21)	77 (25)	83 (28)	89 (32)	92 (33)	91 (33)	88 (31)	79 (26)	68 (20)	59 (15)	76 (24)
Mean daily minimum °F (°C)	39 (4)	41 (5)	49 (9)	55 (13)	63 (17)	69 (21)	72 (22)	71 (22)	66 (19)	55 (13)	48 (9)	41 (5)	56 (13)
Record low °F (°C)	4 (−16)	8 (−13)	18 (−8)	28 (−2)	30 (−1)	49 (9)	55 (13)	50 (10)	40 (4)	27 (−3)	18 (−8)	5 (−15)	4 (−16)
Average precipitation inches (mm)	6.44 (164)	5.03 (128)	6.74 (171)	6.07 (154)	5.49 (139)	4.68 (119)	4.03 (102)	3.89 (99)	3.73 (95)	3.97 (101)	5.58 (142)	6.44 (164)	62.09 (1,578)
Average snowfall inches (cm)	0.7 (1.8)	0.2 (0.51)	0.1 (0.25)	0 (0)	0 (0)	0 (0)	0 (0)	0 (0)	0 (0)	0 (0)	0 (0)	0 (0)	1 (2.56)

== Demographics ==
Historical population
Census	Pop.	Note	%±
1910	577		—
1920	1,044		80.9%
1930	2,502		139.7%
1940	2,857		14.2%
1950	3,847		34.7%
1960	4,563		18.6%
1970	5,239		14.8%
1980	4,472		−14.6%
1990	4,111		−8.1%
2000	3,723		−9.4%
2010	3,511		−5.7%
2020	3,189		−9.2%
2025 (est.)	2,984	▼	−6.4%
U.S. Decennial Census

=== 2020 census ===
Ferriday racial composition
Race	Number	Percentage
White (non-Hispanic)	362	11.35%
Black or African American (non-Hispanic)	2,704	84.79%
Native American	10	0.31%
Asian	7	0.22%
Other/Mixed	55	1.72%
Hispanic or Latino	51	1.6%

As of the 2020 United States census, there were 3,189 people, 1,354 households, and 885 families residing in the town.

=== 2000 census ===
As of the census of 2000, there were 3,723 people, 1,350 households, and 918 families residing in the town. The population density was 2,220.7 inhabitants per square mile (857.4/km^{2}). There were 1,498 housing units at an average density of 893.5 per square mile (345.0/km^{2}). The racial makeup of the town was 74.89% African American, 24.09% White, 0.19% Native American, 0.27% Asian, 0.03% Pacific Islander, 0.19% from other races, and 0.35% from two or more races. Hispanic or Latino of any race were 0.46% of the population.

There were 1,350 households, out of which 34.0% had children under the age of 18 living with them, 30.7% were married couples living together, 33.8% had a female householder with no husband present, and 32.0% were non-families. 29.3% of all households were made up of individuals, and 13.4% had someone living alone who was 65 years of age or older. The average household size was 2.62 and the average family size was 3.27.

In the town, the population was spread out, with 32.0% under the age of 18, 9.6% from 18 to 24, 22.2% from 25 to 44, 18.6% from 45 to 64, and 17.5% who were 65 years of age or older. The median age was 34 years. For every 100 females, there were 76.2 males. For every 100 females age 18 and over, there were 68.2 males.

The median income for a household in the town was $14,732, and the median income for a family was $18,636. Males had a median income of $23,654 versus $16,725 for females. The per capita income for the town was $8,767. About 40.7% of families and 47.4% of the population were below the poverty line, including 70.2% of those under age 18 and 25.1% of those age 65 or over.

In 2010, Ferriday had the 15th-lowest median household income of all places in the United States with a population over 1,000.

== Education ==
The Concordia Parish School Board serves Ferriday. Ferriday High School is located off LA 15. Its sports teams are known as the Trojans. To the right rear of the high school is the Concordia Parish Library.

Central Louisiana Technical Community College has a campus located in Ferriday.

== Notable people ==
- Andy Anders, former state representative for Concordia Parish
- Campbell Brown (b. 1968), NBC and CNN news correspondent
- James H. Brown, state senator (1972-80), Louisiana Secretary of State (1980-88) and Insurance Commissioner (1992-2004); father of Campbell Brown
- Brenham C. Crothers (1905–1984), state senator from 1948 to 1952 and 1956 to 1960
- Mickey Gilley (1936–2022), country musician
- Dale Houston (1940–2007), whose single "I'm Leaving It Up to You" reached No. 1 in 1963
- Jerry Lee Lewis (1935–2022), rock and roll pioneer, pianist
- Howard K. Smith (1914–2002), CBS and ABC commentator and anchorman
- Jimmy Lee Swaggart (1935–2025), evangelist
- Jimmy Warren (1939–2006), college, professional football player and coach

== Photo gallery ==
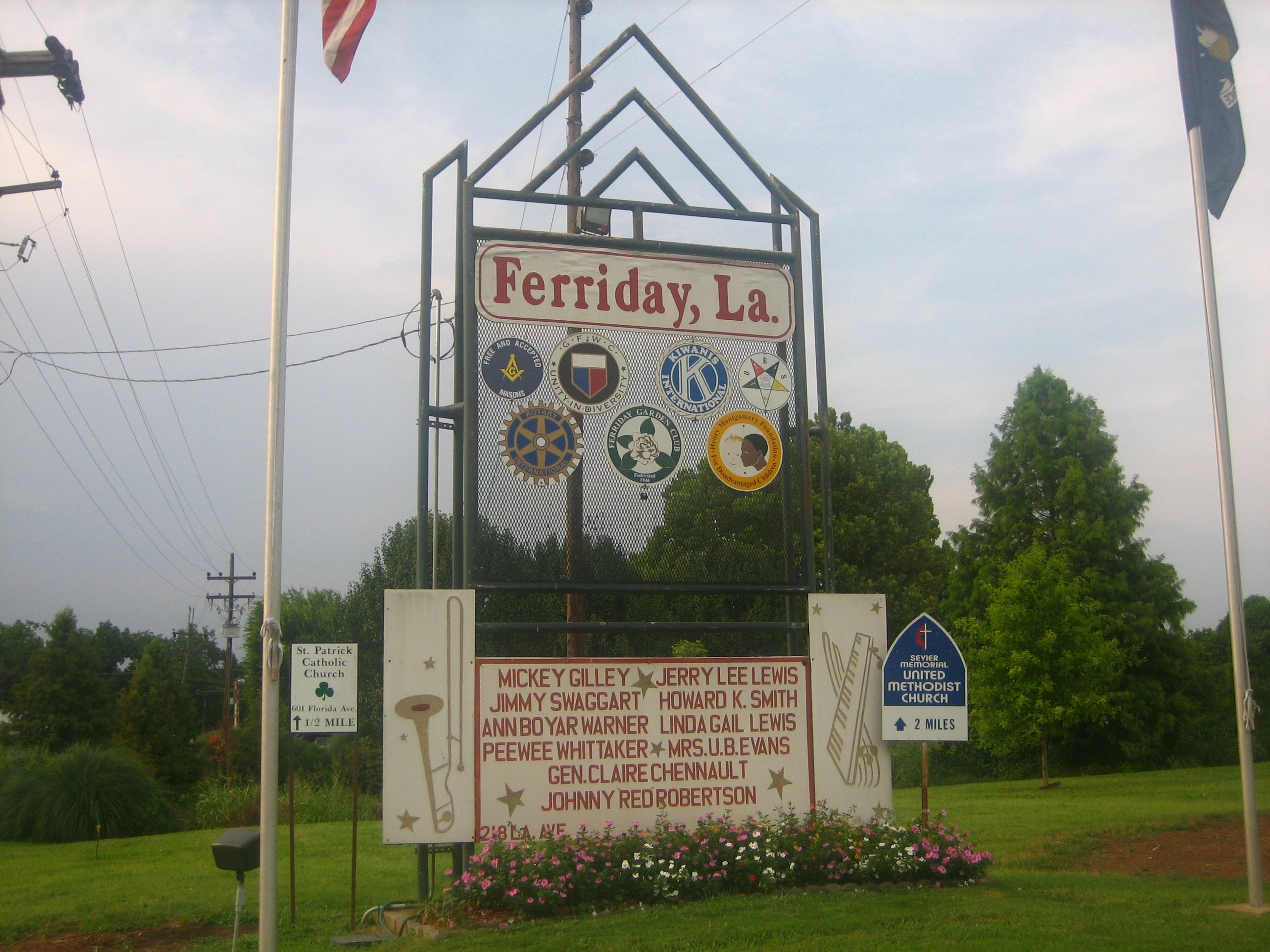
Ferriday welcoming sign on LA 15

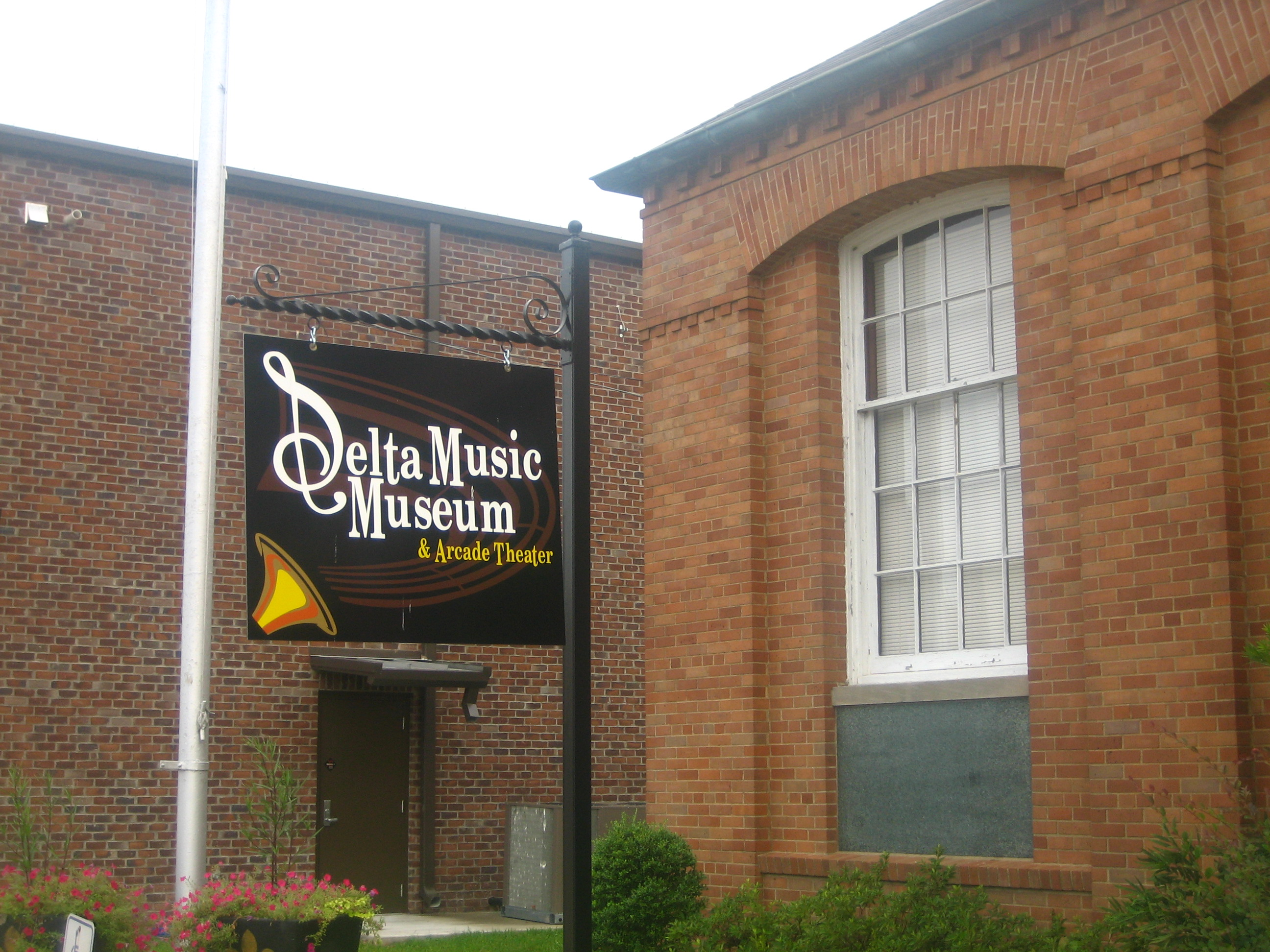
Delta Music Museum

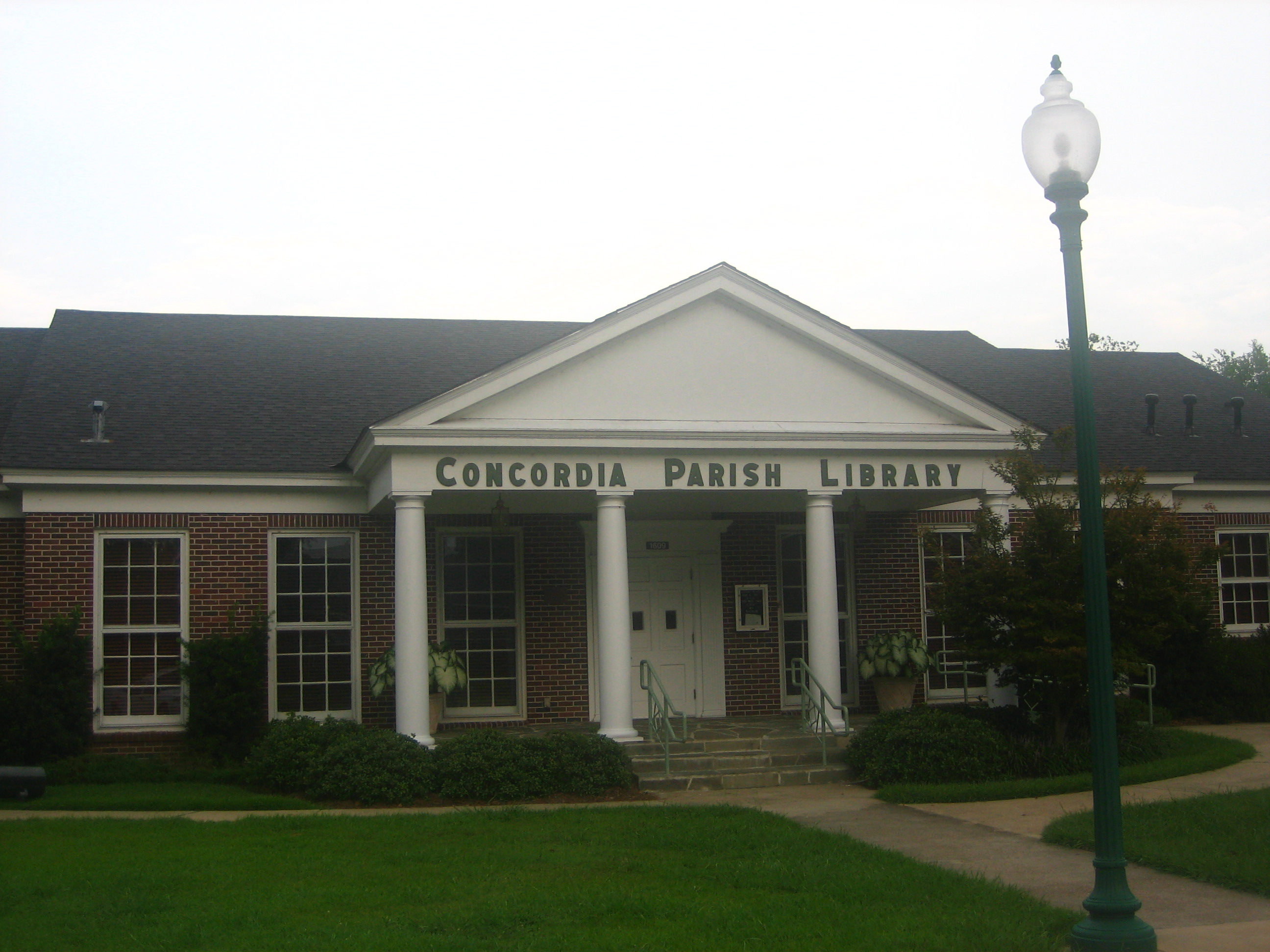
The Concordia Parish Library in Ferriday

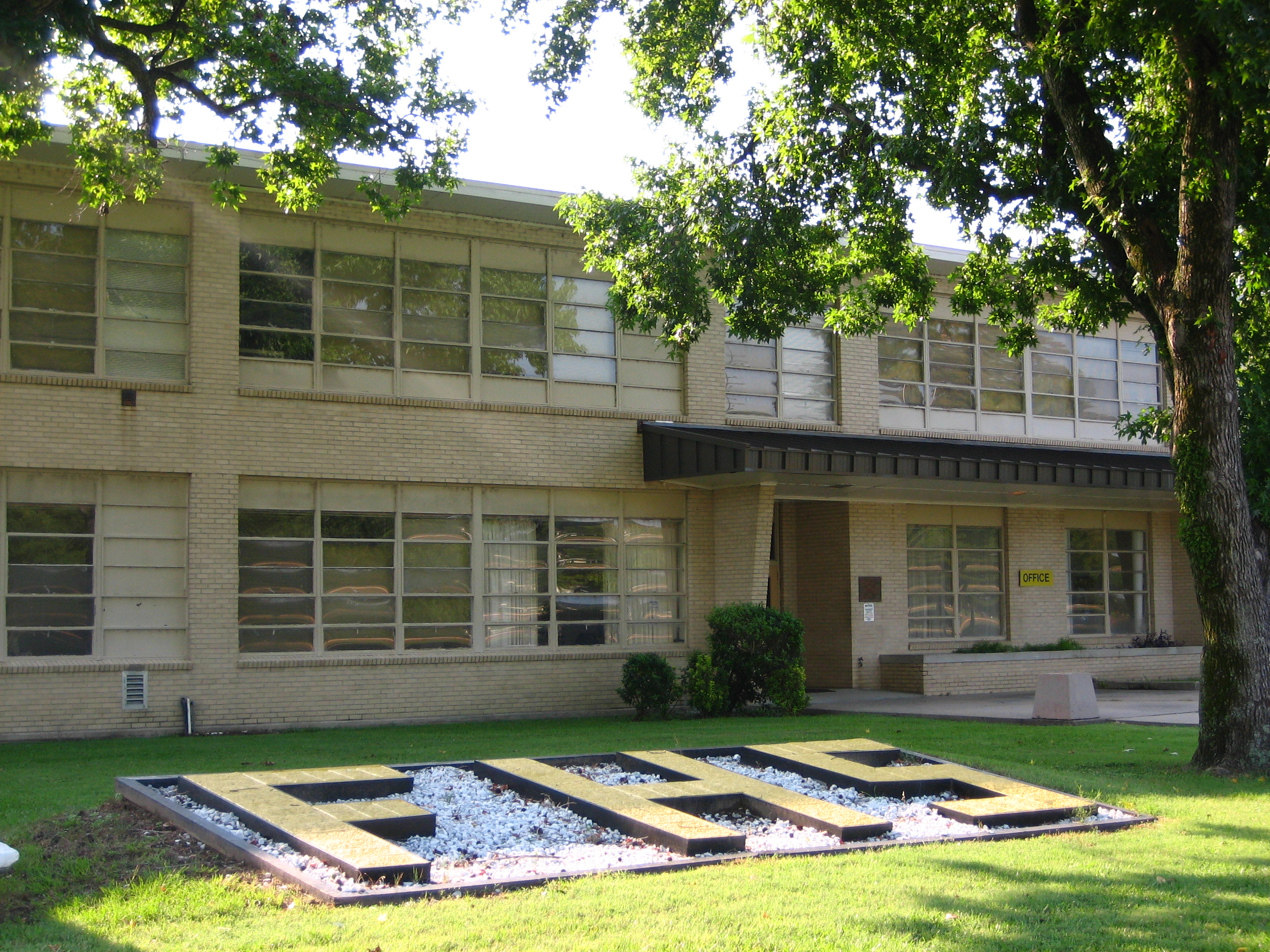
"FHS" carved in shrubbery at Ferriday High School

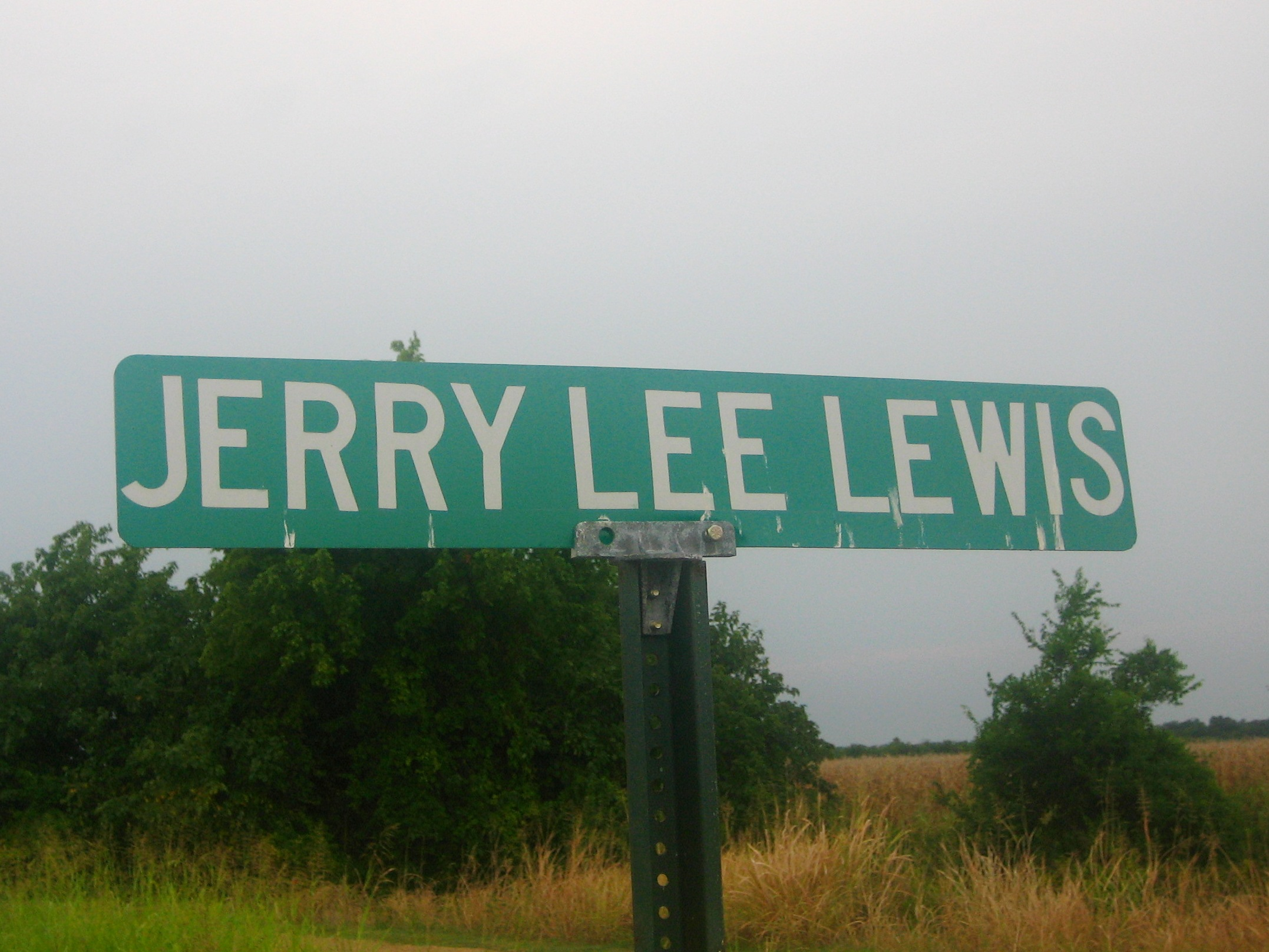
Jerry Lee Lewis Drive in Ferriday en route to Huntington School (now Delta Charter School).

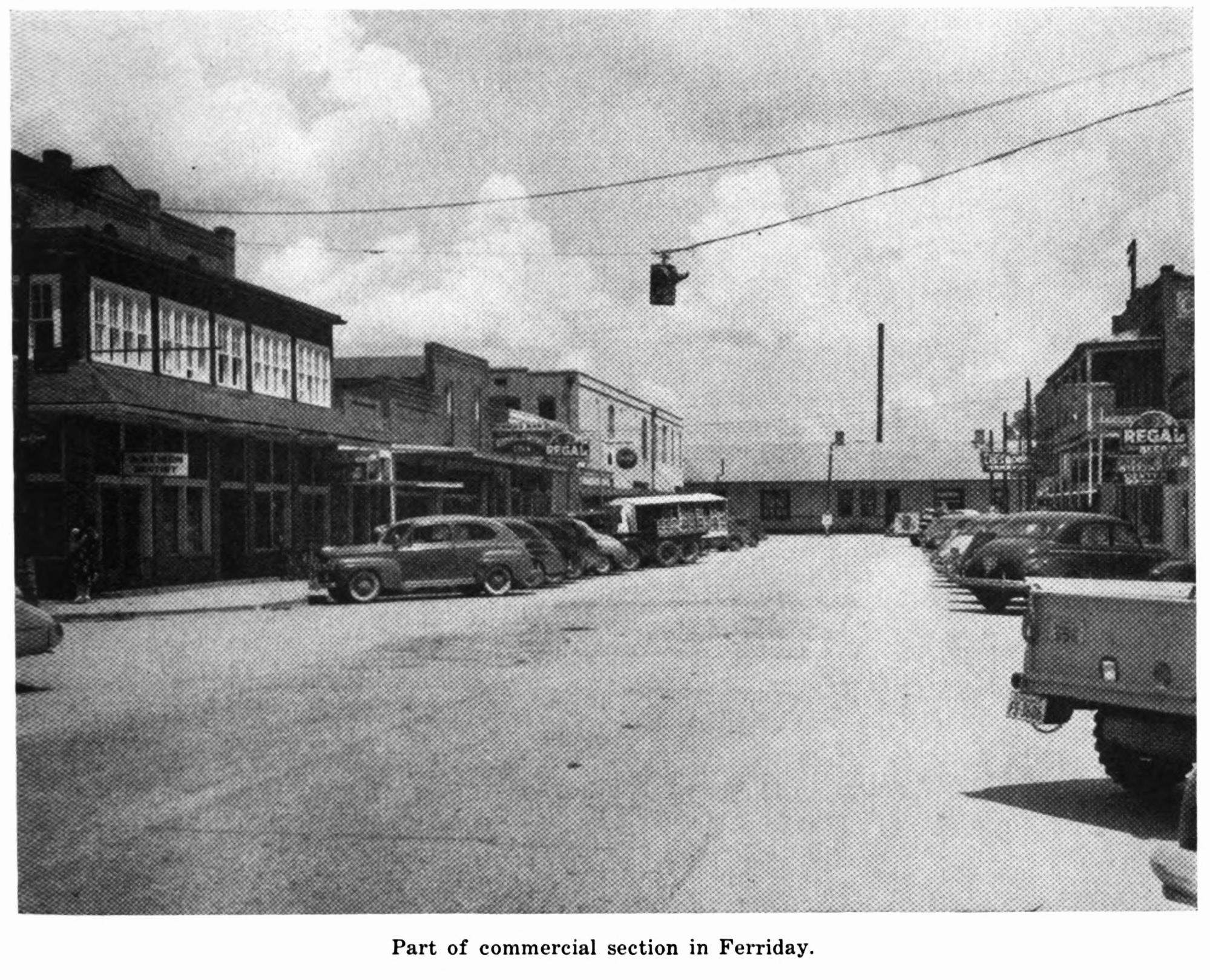
Downtown Ferriday circa 1949
