= 1885 Ohio gubernatorial election =

- October 13, 1885
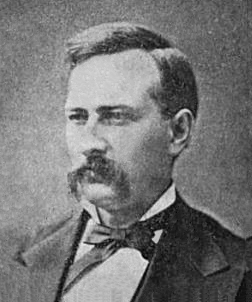

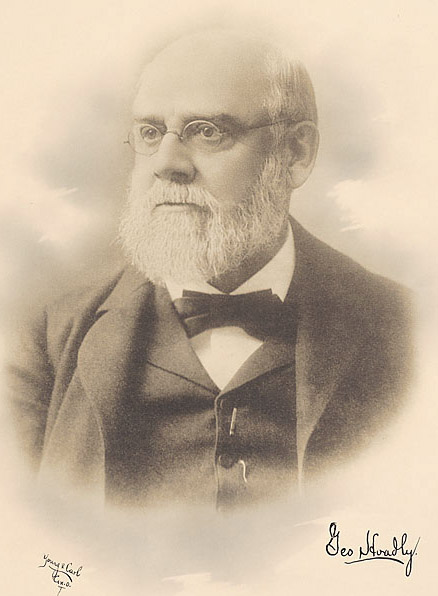
Nominee	Joseph B. Foraker	George Hoadly
Party	Republican	Democratic
Popular vote	359,281	341,830
Percentage	48.95%	46.57%
- County results Foraker: 40–50% 50–60% 60–70% 70–80% Hoadly: 40–50% 50–60% 60–70%
Governor before election
George Hoadly
Democratic
Elected Governor
Joseph B. Foraker
Republican

The 1885 Ohio gubernatorial election was held on October 13, 1885. Republican nominee Joseph B. Foraker defeated Democratic incumbent George Hoadly in a rematch of the 1883 election with 48.95% of the vote.

== General election ==
=== Candidates ===
Major party candidates

- Joseph B. Foraker, Republican
- George Hoadly, Democratic

Other candidates

- Adna B. Leonard, Prohibition
- John W. Northrop, Greenback

=== Results ===
1885 Ohio gubernatorial election
Party	Candidate	Votes	%	±%
Republican	Joseph B. Foraker	359,281	48.95%	
Democratic	George Hoadly (incumbent)	341,830	46.57%	
Prohibition	Adna B. Leonard	28,081	3.83%	
Greenback	John W. Northrop	2,001	0.27%	
Majority		17,451		
Turnout				
Republican gain from Democratic		Swing		
