= 1884 Republican National Convention =

American political convention

- 1884 presidential election
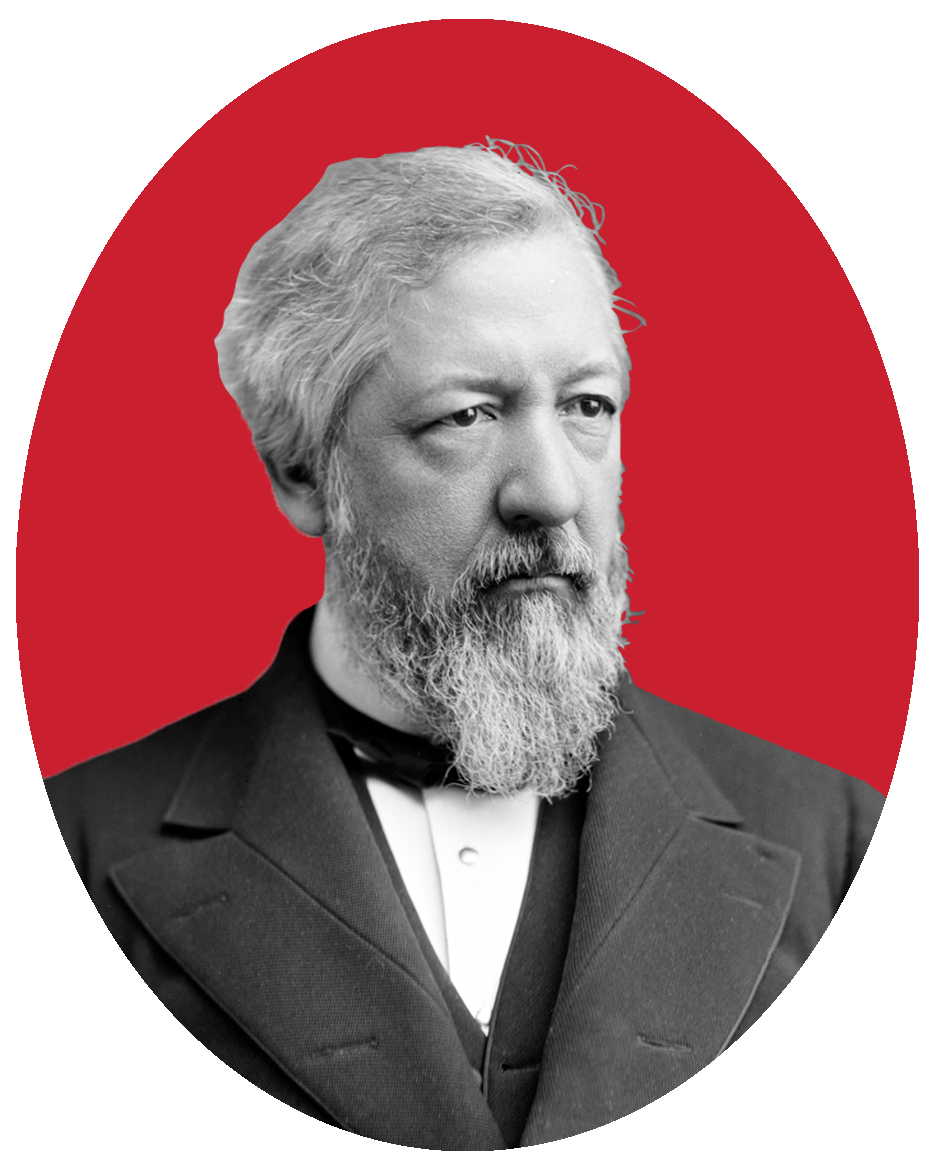
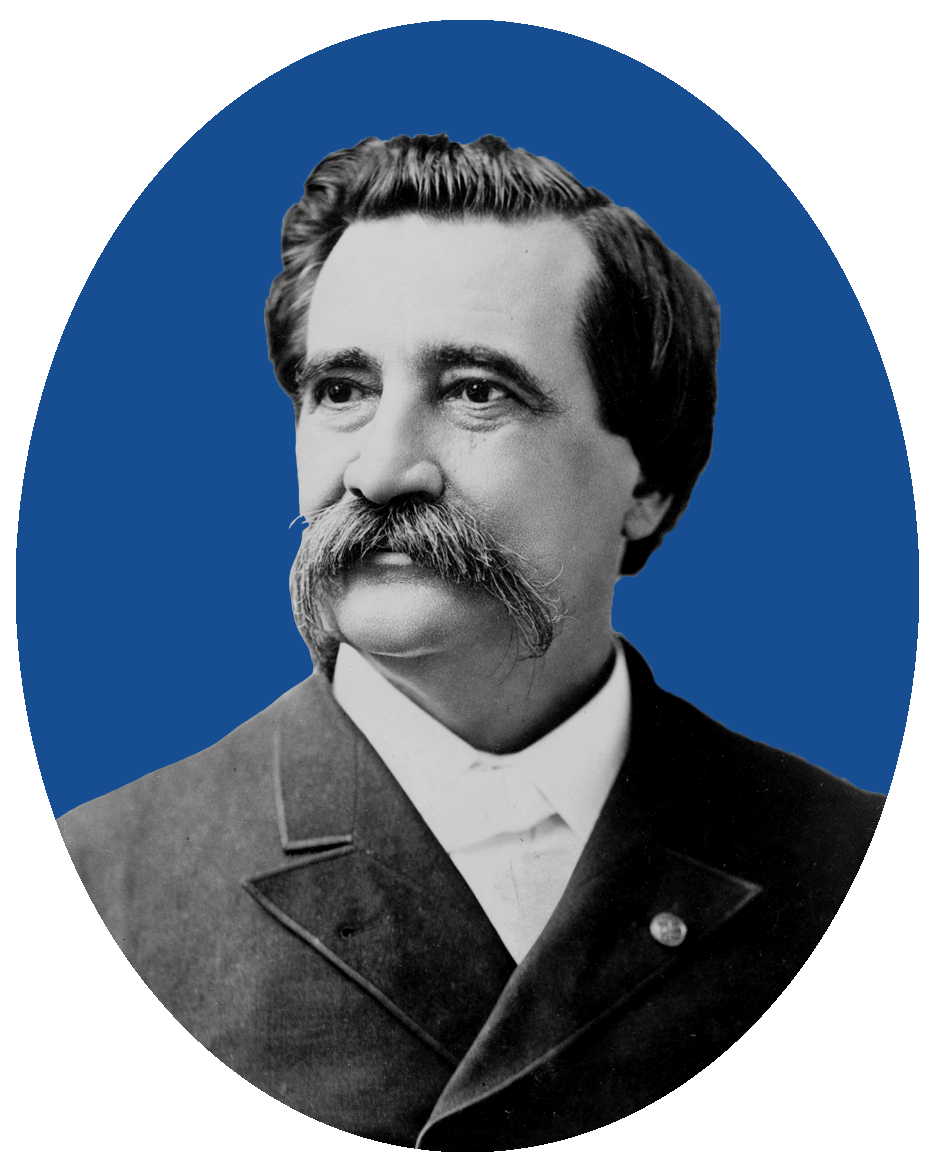
- Nominees; Blaine and Logan

Convention
- Date(s): June 3–6, 1884
- City: Chicago, Illinois
- Venue: Exposition Hall
- Chair: John B. Henderson
- Keynote speaker: John R. Lynch

Candidates
- Presidential nominee: James G. Blaine of Maine
- Vice-presidential nominee: John A. Logan of Illinois
- Other candidates: Chester A. Arthur; George F. Edmunds

Voting
- Total delegates: 832
- Votes needed for nomination: 417
- Results (president): Blaine (ME): 541 (65.98%); Arthur (NY): 207 (25.24%); Edmunds (VT): 41 (5%); Logan (IL): 7 (0.85%); Others: 24 (2.93%)
- Results (vice president): Logan (IL): 779 (95%); Abstaining: 34 (4.15%); Gresham (IN): 6 (0.73%); Foraker (OH): 1 (0.12%)
- Ballots: 4

The 1884 Republican National Convention was a presidential nominating convention held at the Exposition Hall in Chicago, on June 3–6, 1884. It resulted in the nomination of former House Speaker James G. Blaine from Maine for president and Senator John A. Logan of Illinois for vice president. The ticket lost in the election of 1884 to Democrats Grover Cleveland and Thomas A. Hendricks.

In attendance were 1,600 delegates and alternates and 6,000 spectators. There were 820 official delegates; 411 votes were needed to win the nomination. The incumbent president, Chester A. Arthur, was not a serious contender due to ill health. Blaine was the favorite going in, but there was a possibility that President Arthur could build a coalition with smaller candidates such as George F. Edmunds. There were also rumors that members of the party would bolt if Blaine won the nomination. Neither Blaine nor Arthur were in attendance. Blaine was at his home in Augusta, Maine, and Arthur followed the events from the White House by telegraphy.

== Preparations and logistics ==
The convention was held in Chicago, Illinois at the Exhibition Hall building, which was located on Michigan Avenue. Since hosting the 1860 Republican National Convention, Chicago had established itself as a frequent site of United States presidential nominating conventions. This was in large part due to its relatively central geographic location and its accessibility by railroad.

On April 7, a meeting was held in Chicago with members of a subcommittee of the Republican National Committee and a local host committee in order plan arrangements for the convention. At this meeting, a decision was made to limit the capacity of the convention hall to 9,000. It was also agreed that the local host committee would be given 1,000 tickets to be distributed to Chicago locals. The meeting also saw various local subcommittees established to organize specific aspects of the convention's logistics. The local subcommittees established for arrangements included subcommittees on finance, transportation, decoration, music, official register, press, hotel, telegraph, official publication, official reporting.

On May 26, W. R. Sullivan (the secretary for the local host committee) sent a report to the Republican National Committee summarizing the state of preparations, and detailing the proceedings of meetings that the local host committee had held. He reported that preparations were nearly complete. John C. New (chairman of the Republic National Committee's subcommittee for convention preparations) arrived in Chicago that same day to oversee the final preparations. He established his headquarters at the Palmer House hotel. On his first day in Chicago, New inspected the convention hall, accompanied by individuals overseeing various aspects of convention preparations. He was also accompanied by William Henry Smith of the Associated Press as well as the local Western Union Telegraph Company manager, touring and assessing the spaces set aside for the anticipated 300 journalists that would cover the convention on behalf of newspapers.

=== Exhibition hall arrangement ===
While the 1880 Republican convention held at the same venue had been staged in the southern end of Exhibition Hall, it was decided to stage the 1884 convention in its northern end. The 9,000 person capacity of the convention hall setup was smaller than the capacity of the 1880 convention. However, all attendees of the 1884 convention were given chair seating, a change from the uncomfortable bench seating that made up a bulk of seating at the 1880 convention. The walls of the convention hall were painted with fireproof blue and red paint. Signs over entrances were colored to match the color-coding of corresponding tickets. Work tables for newspaper reporters were placed on the floor of the convention hall (some located directly in front of the stage and perpendicular to it, others erected to the sides of the stage and set at a right angle from it), as well as a special balcony for those press representatives who did not need a worktable. Other spaces for newspaper reporters included rooms set aside for additional workspace, as well as telegraphy rooms.

A New York Evening Post press dispatch released before the convention reported on the convention hall,

The great chamber, with its more than nine thousand light comfortable chairs, arranged in imposing lines, is a pretty sight. The only fear of inconvenience is in regard to the ventilation. The windows are all high, near the roof, and while they will receive the heat of the afternoon sun, they will not give entrance to much fresh air for the crowd below.

The majority individuals selected by James A. Saxton (the convention sergeant-at-arms) to fill operations roles were locals of Chicago. Saxton selected twelve assistant sergeant-at-arms, 75 ushers, 25 pages, between thirty and forty watchmen, 75 doorkeepers, and thirty janitors ("sweepers" and "scrubbers"). All of those selected to be doorkeepers were recruited from the Union Veteran Club.

The convention was attended by 1,600 delegates and alternates as well as 6,000 spectators. 9,451 entrance tickets were printed for the convention on engraved steel by the Western Bank Note and Engraving Company.

=== Hotels ===
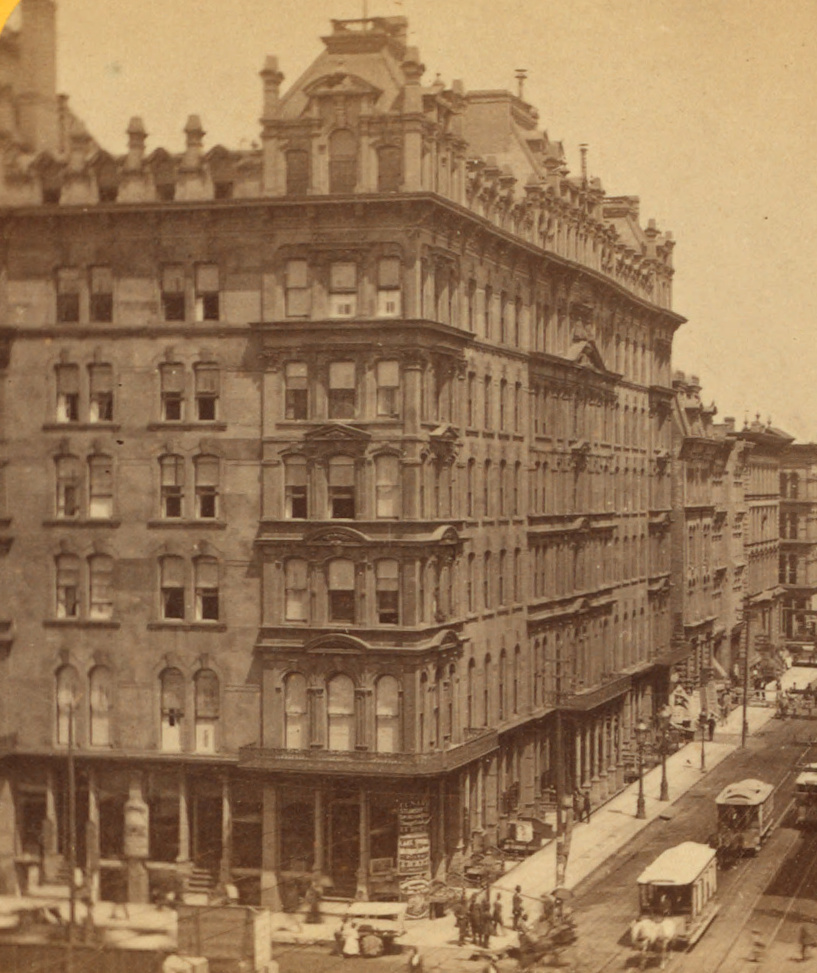
Sherman House

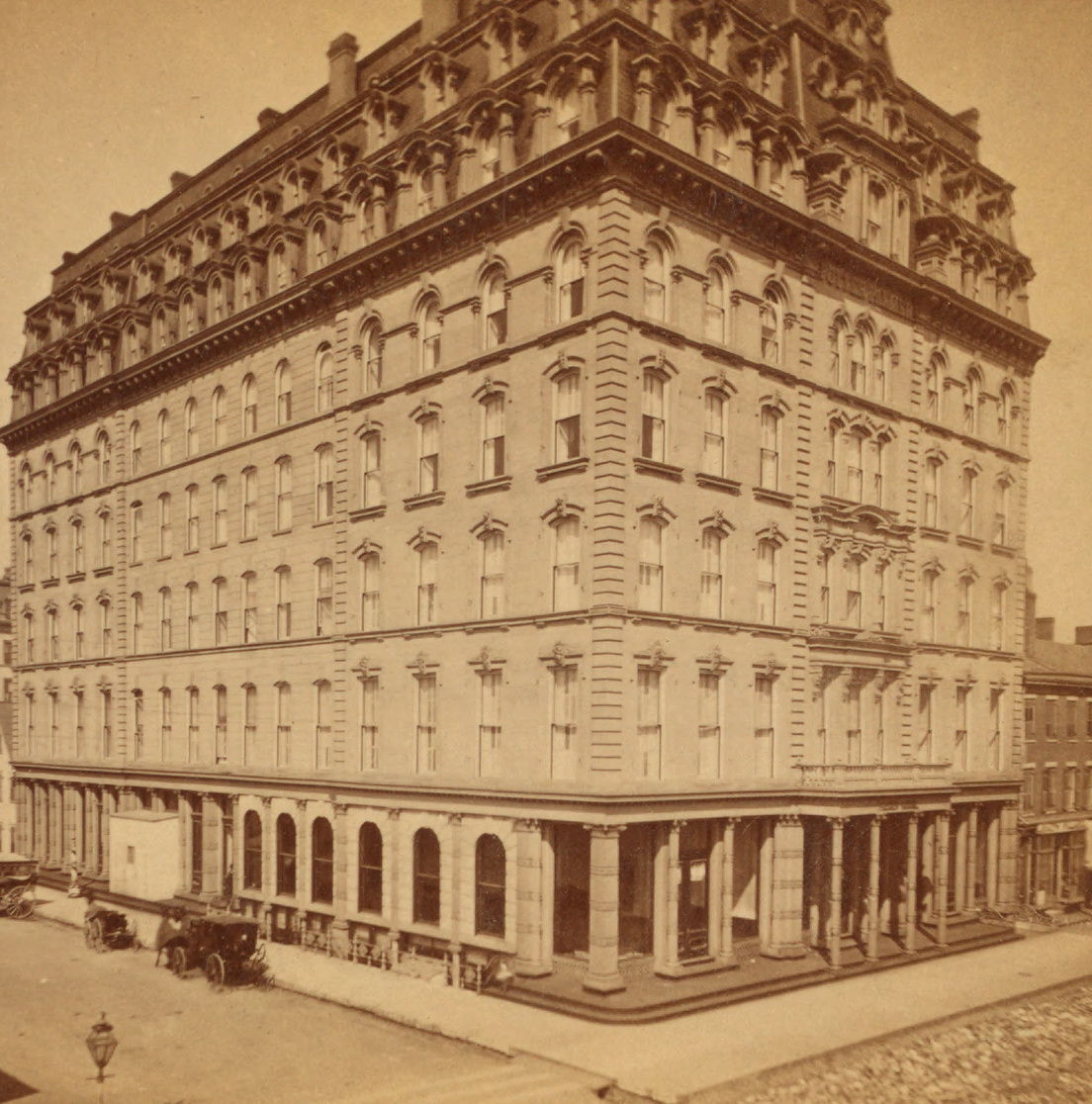
Palmer House

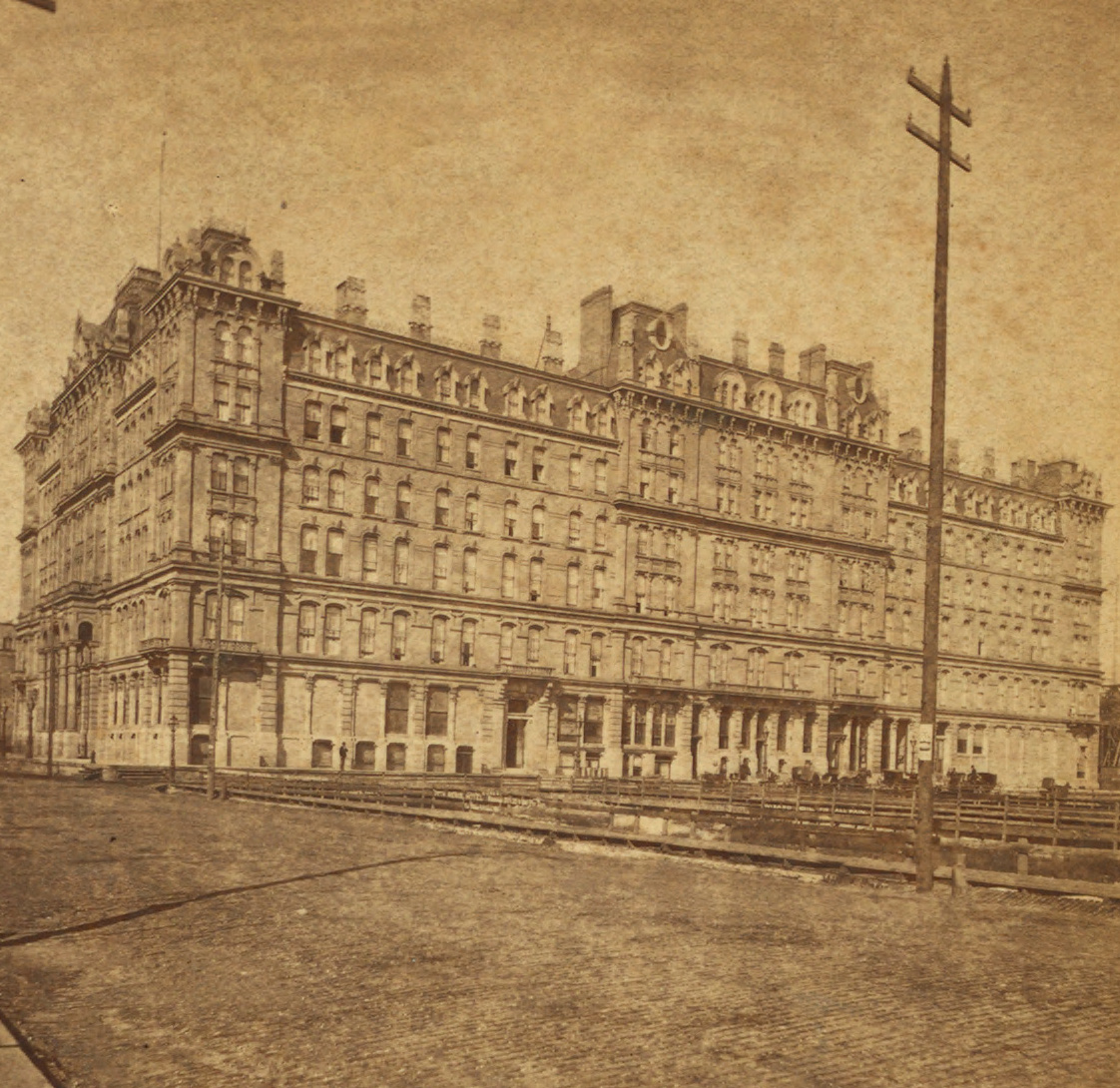
Grand Pacific Hotel

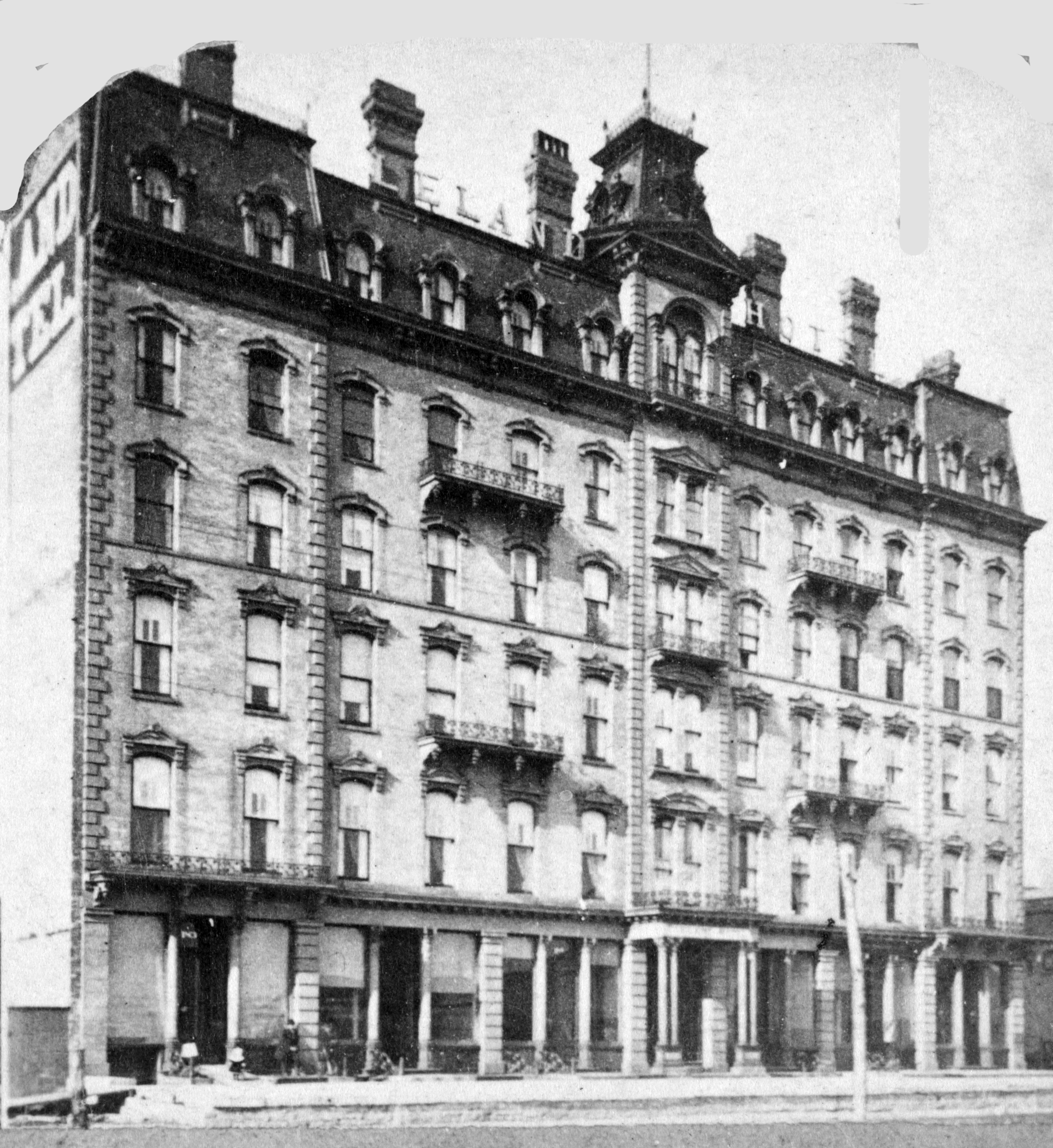
Leland Hotel

The Sherman House, Palmer House, Grand Pacific, Leland Hotel accommodated most state delegations

The local hotel subcommittee was dissolved at its members request after they discovered that state delegations were already independently taking care of arranging their overnight accommodations.

The Sherman House accommodated delegates from Alabama, Arkansas, Iowa, South Carolina, and Tennessee. The Palmer House accommodated delegates from California, Georgia, Florida, Kansas, Kentucky, Maryland, Mississippi, Missouri, Nebraska, Rhode Island, Texas, Vermont, Virginia, and Wyoming. The Grand Pacific Hotel accommodated delegates from Colorado, Connecticut, District of Columbia, Illinois, Indiana, Louisiana, Minnesota, New Hampshire, New Jersey, New York, Ohio, Oregon, Pennsylvania, and Wisconsin. The Leland Hotel accommodated delegates from Delaware, Massachusetts, as well as portions of the Maine and New York delegations. The Crawford House accommodated delegates from West Virginia. The Tremont House accommodated delegates from Michigan. The Sherman House, Palmer House, Grand Pacific, and Tremont House were considered the "big four" prestigious hotels constructed in Chicago after the Great Chicago Fire of 1871.

== Pre-balloting maneuvers ==
To test the waters, Blaine supporters nominated Powell Clayton as temporary chair of the convention. A former Arthur supporter, Clayton was now in Blaine's camp. He was popular with veterans, but was also associated with the Star Route Frauds. Edmunds's supporters, led by Henry C. Lodge, moved to nominate John R. Lynch instead, an African-American from Mississippi. The speech supporting Lynch was given by Theodore Roosevelt. Lynch won the vote 424 to 384, and Blaine's nomination seemed for the first time vulnerable.

Blaine's future seemed more vulnerable the next day when, to address the rumors of party members bolting, his supporters made a motion to remove seats of delegates who failed to pledge support of the eventual nominee. The motion failed, again by the fortitude of Edmunds's supporters. The day closed with John B. Henderson being elected permanent chair of the convention.

That evening leaders of Arthur's and Edmunds's camps met in private in the Grand Pacific Hotel and tried to create a viable coalition. Arthur's team could not guarantee that his supporters would back Edmunds. It was more likely that the second choice of Arthur delegates was Blaine.

The selection of the delegates for the convention saw the advent of a new system which included some delegates selected at the congressional-district level rather than at the state-level. This led to more than 225 delegates being individuals regarded to be relatively independent in their views rather than lockstep with their state party.

== Presidential nomination ==
=== Presidential candidates ===
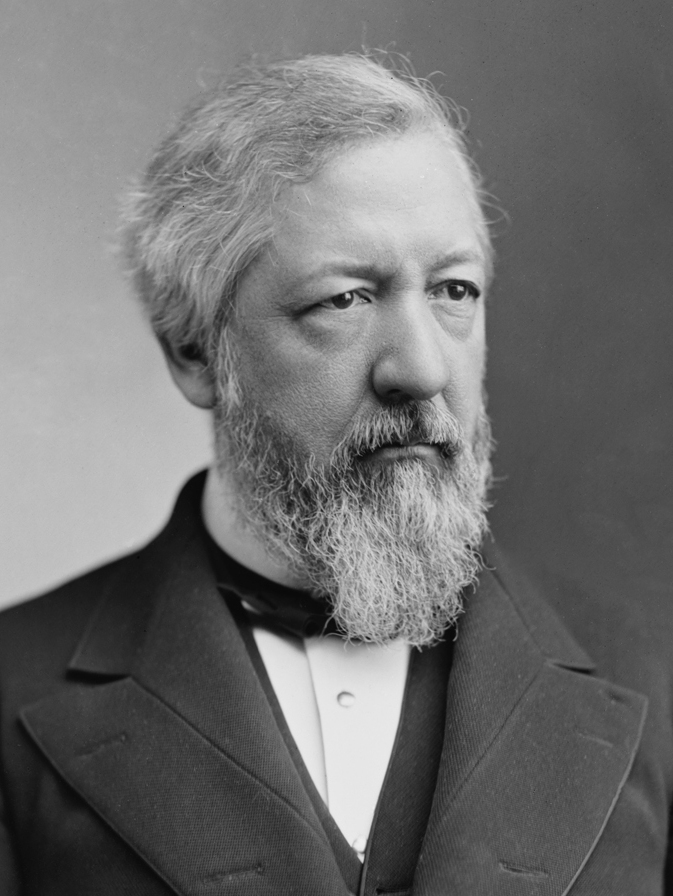
Former Secretary of State
James G. Blaine
from Maine

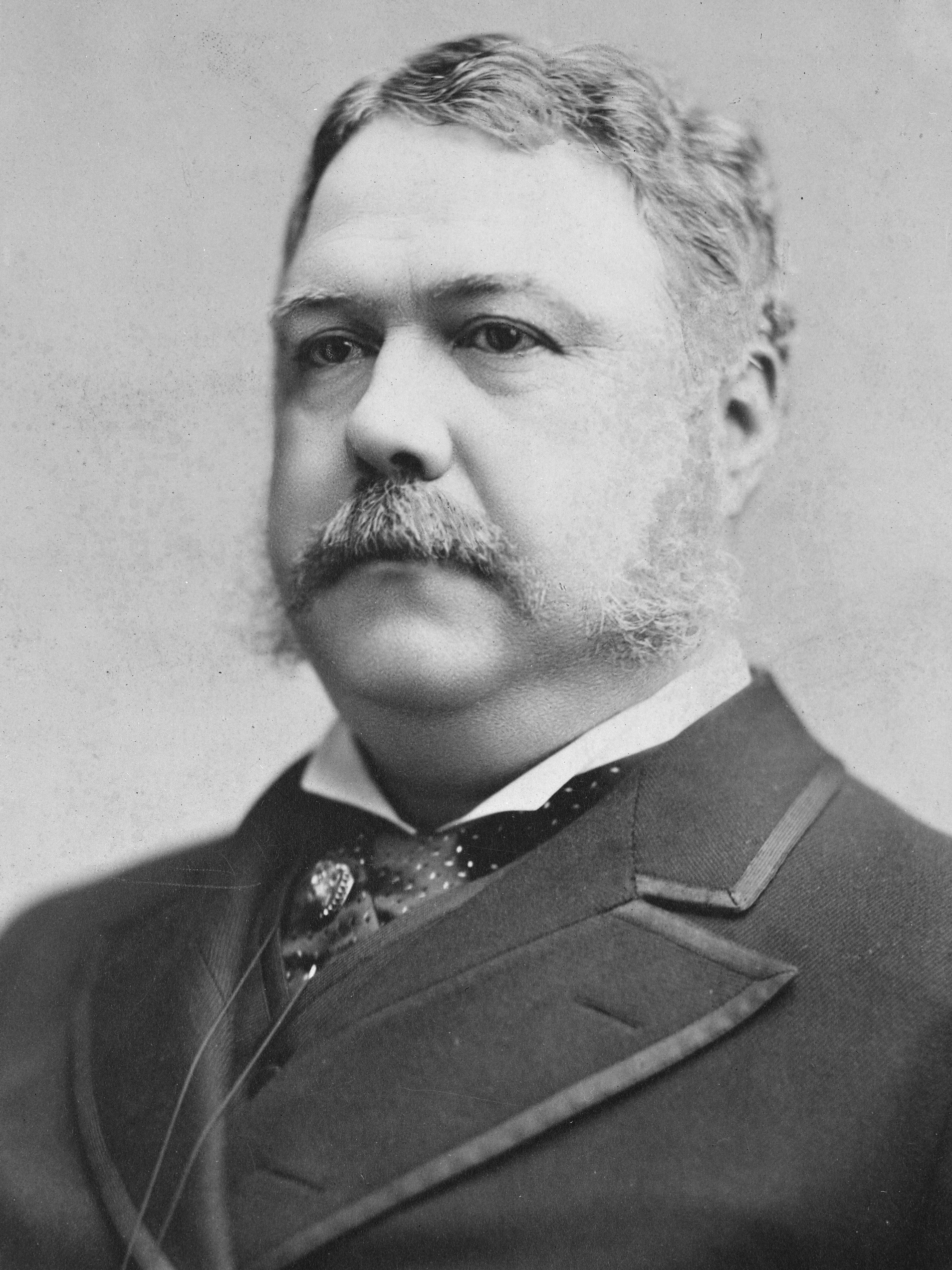
President
Chester A. Arthur
from New York

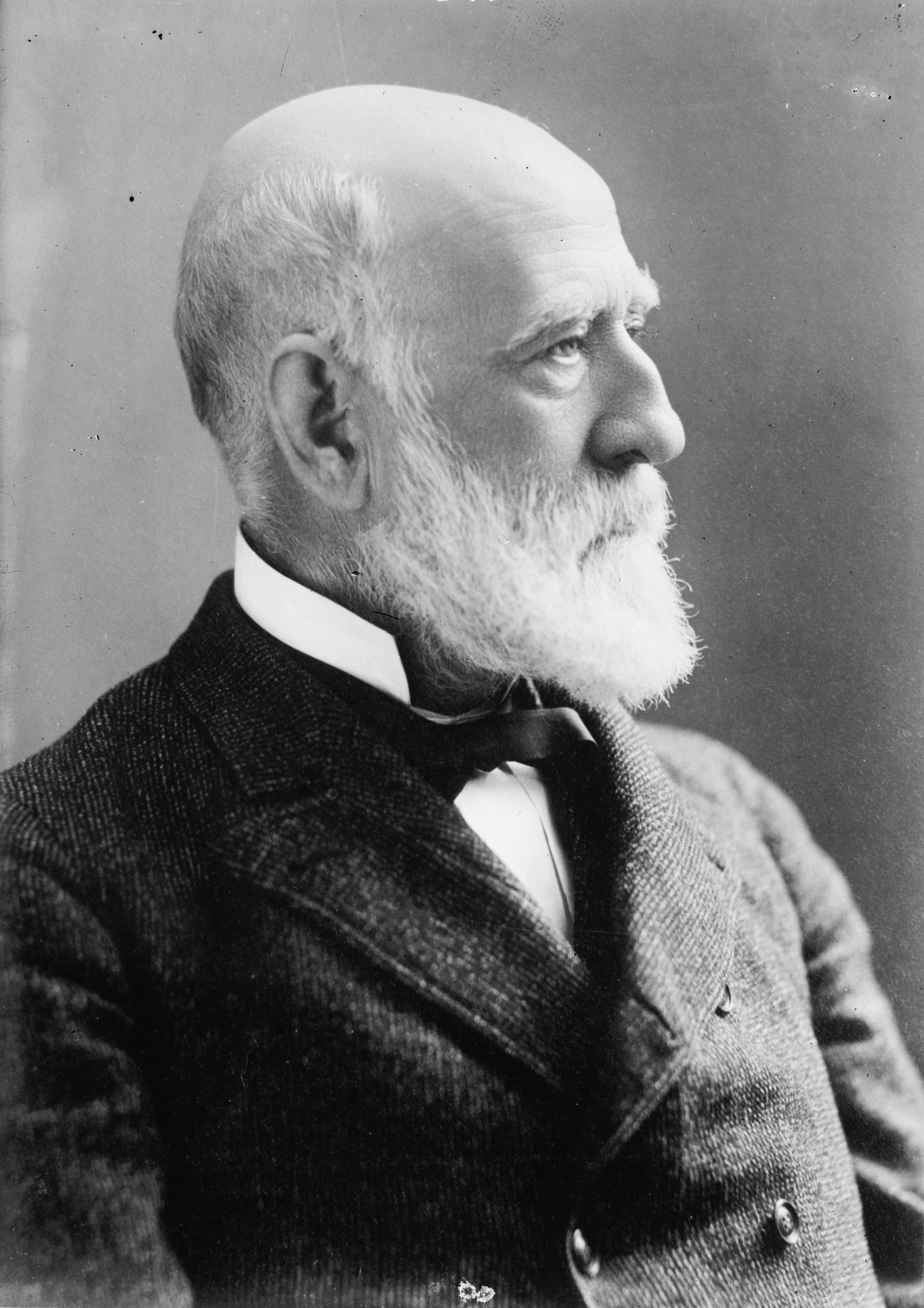
President pro tempore
George F. Edmunds
from Vermont

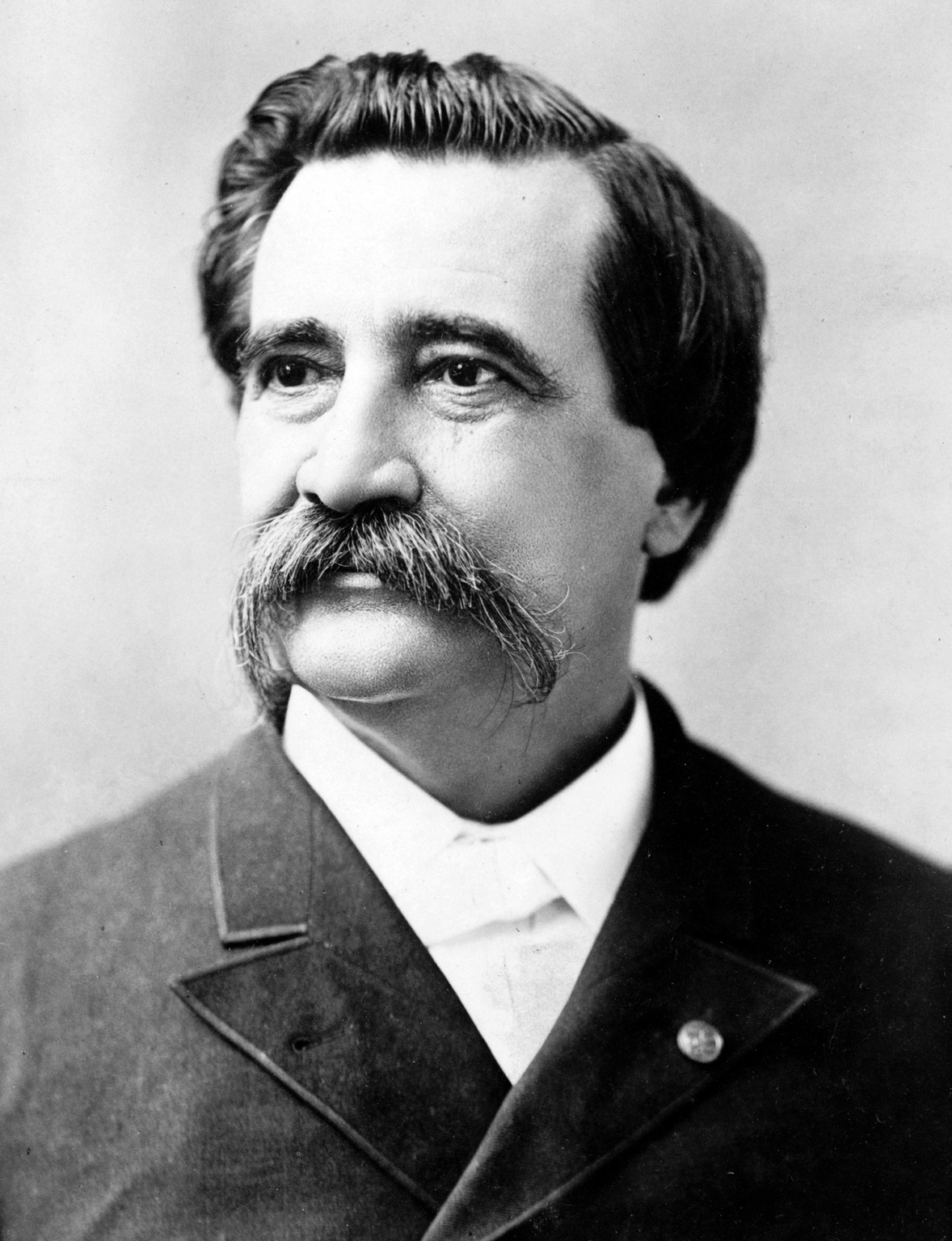
Senator
John A. Logan
from Illinois

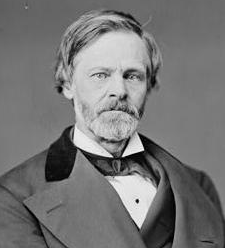
Senator
John Sherman
from Ohio

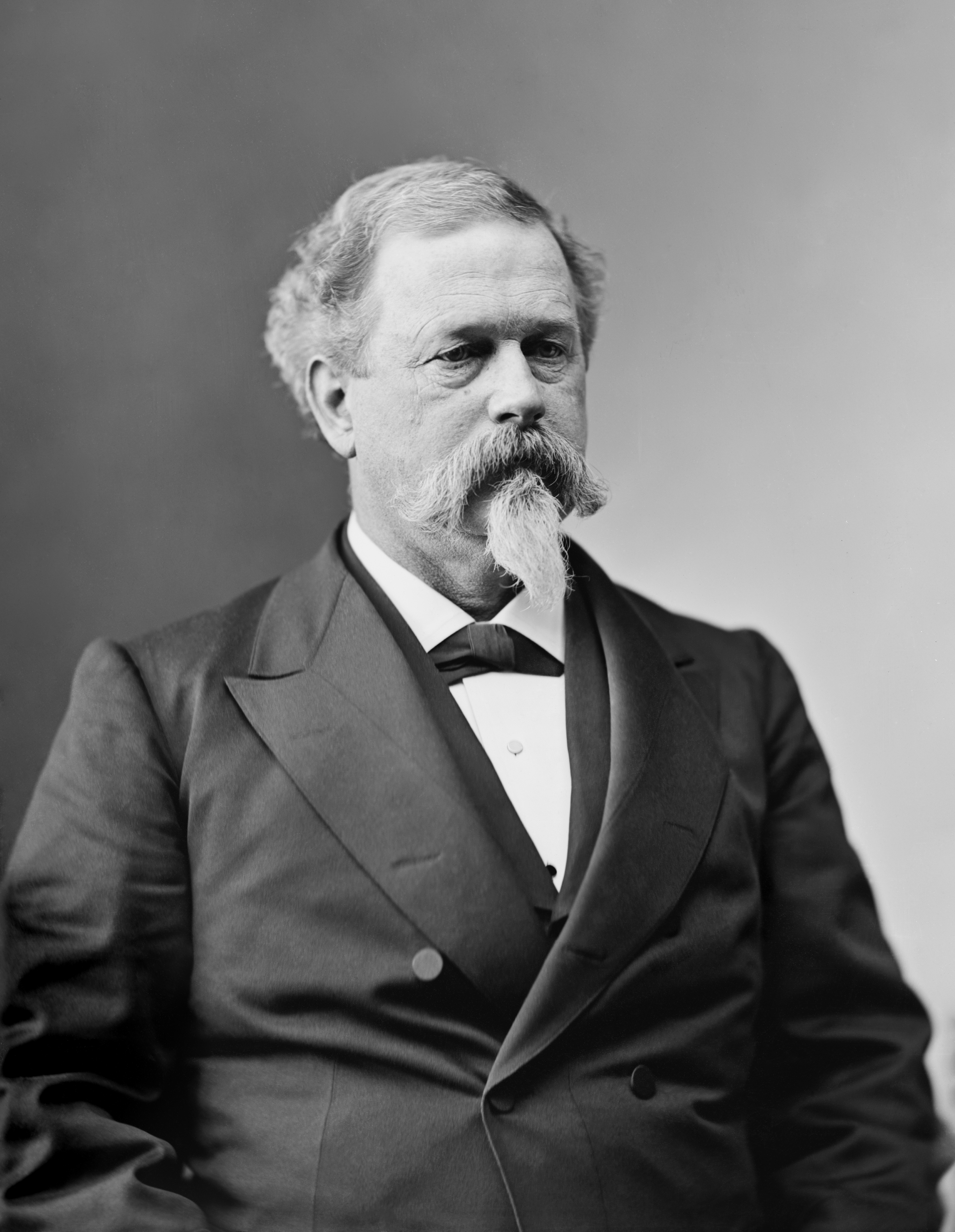
Senator
Joseph R. Hawley
from Connecticut

=== Declined to contest ===
- Secretary of War Robert Todd Lincoln from Illinois
- General William Tecumseh Sherman from Ohio
- Lieutenant General Philip Sheridan from New York

The roll call of the States began the next evening. When Maine was called, the cheering lasted ten minutes, during which time William H. West came to the platform and gave a rabble-rousing speech to second the nomination. After West's speech, pandemonium continued in the building, much to West's chagrin. Further speeches seconding the nomination were given by Cushman Kellogg Davis and Thomas C. Platt.

When the roll call reached New York, it was Arthur's turn to be nominated. Martin I. Townsend's speech was lackluster at best and poorly prepared, Townsend having been selected for the responsibility only after the roll call began. His speech was occasionally drowned out by hisses and eruptions of side conversations. The nomination was seconded by Harry H. Bingham, John R. Lynch and Patrick H. Winston. Bingham's speech was strong, Lynch's brief, and Winston's irritating. Although it was already 11 PM, a motion to adjourn failed. Another speech for Arthur was given by P. B. S. Pinchback, but like the others, it did not sway any support.

To close the night Joseph B. Foraker nominated John Sherman and John Davis Long nominated Edmunds. The delegates adjourned just after midnight.

On the morning of June 6, balloting began.

On the first ballot Blaine received 334½, Arthur 278, Edmunds 93, Logan 63½, and Sherman 30, with Joseph Roswell Hawley, Robert Todd Lincoln and William Tecumseh Sherman receiving parts of the remainder. Arthur received only a third of his votes from the North, none from Ohio, 1 of 44 from Illinois, 9 of 30 from Indiana, 11 of 60 from Pennsylvania and only 31 of 72 from his home state of New York. It was expected that Logan's delegates would shift to Blaine.

On the third ballot, Blaine received 375 (gaining delegates from Edmunds), Arthur 274. On the fourth ballot, Blaine received 541, Arthur 207, and Edmunds 41. Blaine received 130 more than the majority needed, grabbing 67 from Arthur's camp and 28 from Edmunds's.

Presidential ballot
Candidate	1st	2nd	3rd	4th
Blaine	334.5	349	375	541
Arthur *	278	276	274	207
Edmunds	93	85	69	41
Logan	63.5	61	53	7
J. Sherman	30	28	25	0
Hawley	13	13	13	15
Lincoln	4	4	8	2
W. T. Sherman	2	3	2	0
Not Voting	2	1	1	7

Presidential balloting / 4th day of convention (June 6, 1884)

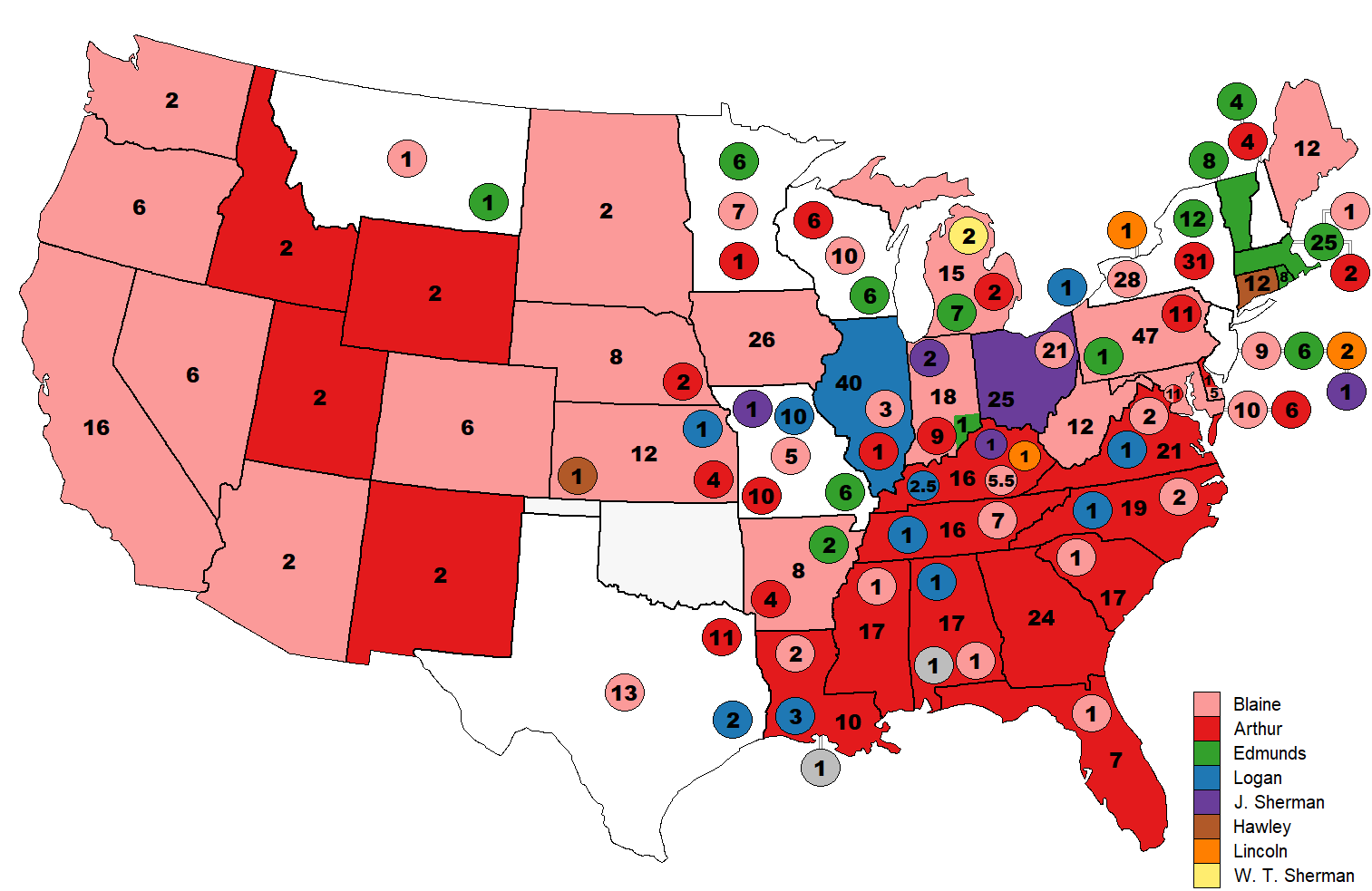
1st Presidential Ballot

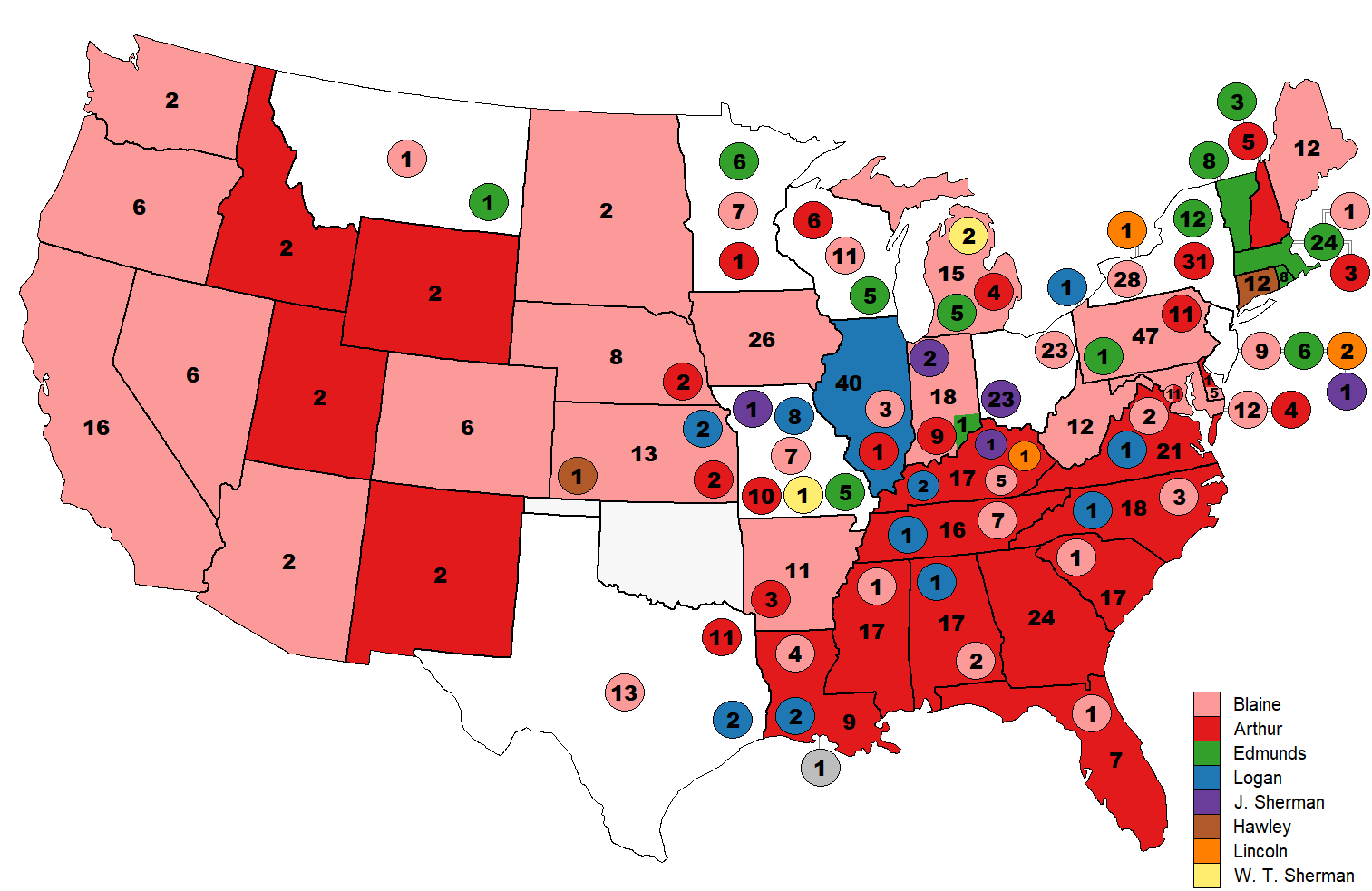
2nd Presidential Ballot

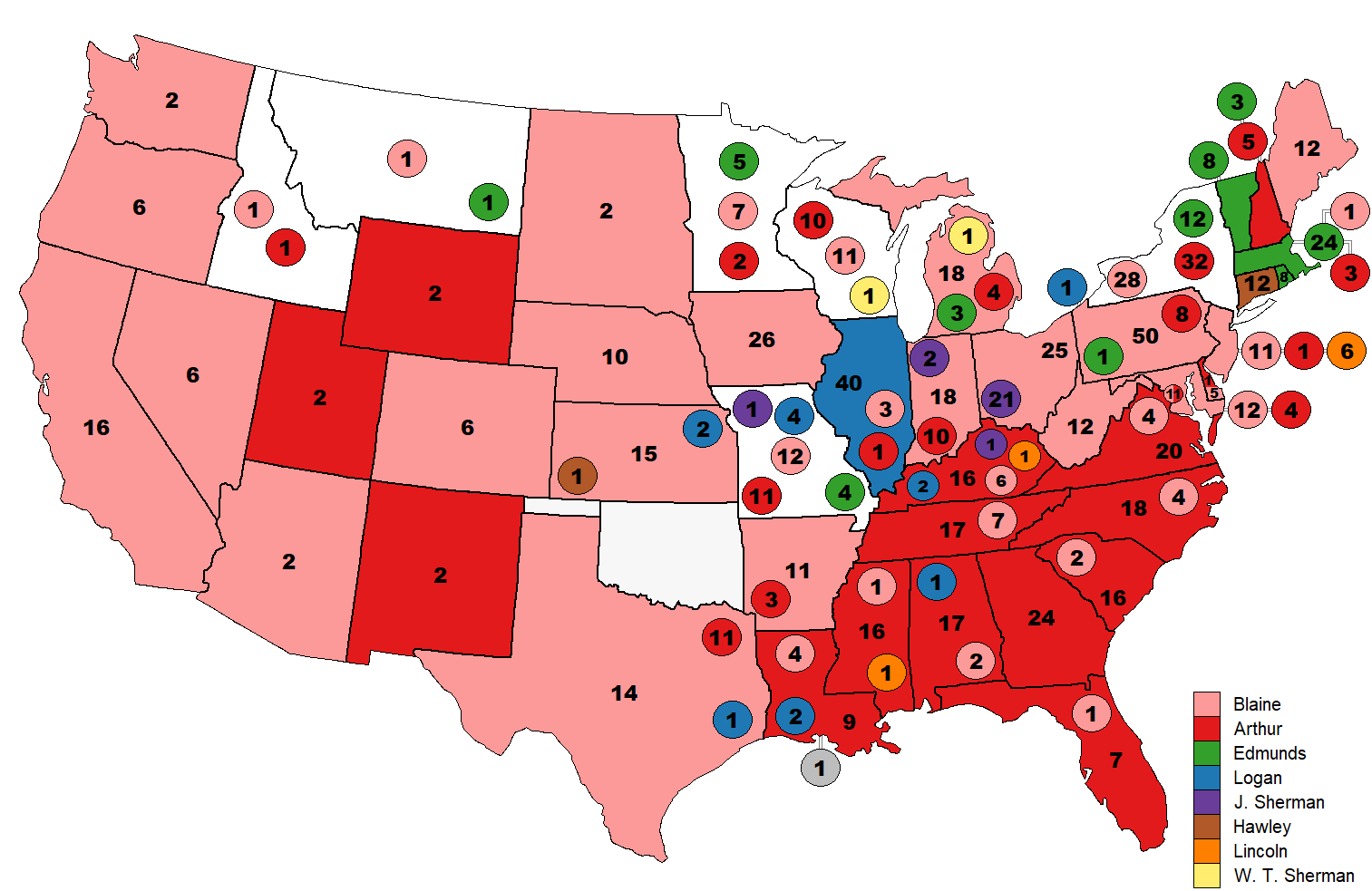
3rd Presidential Ballot

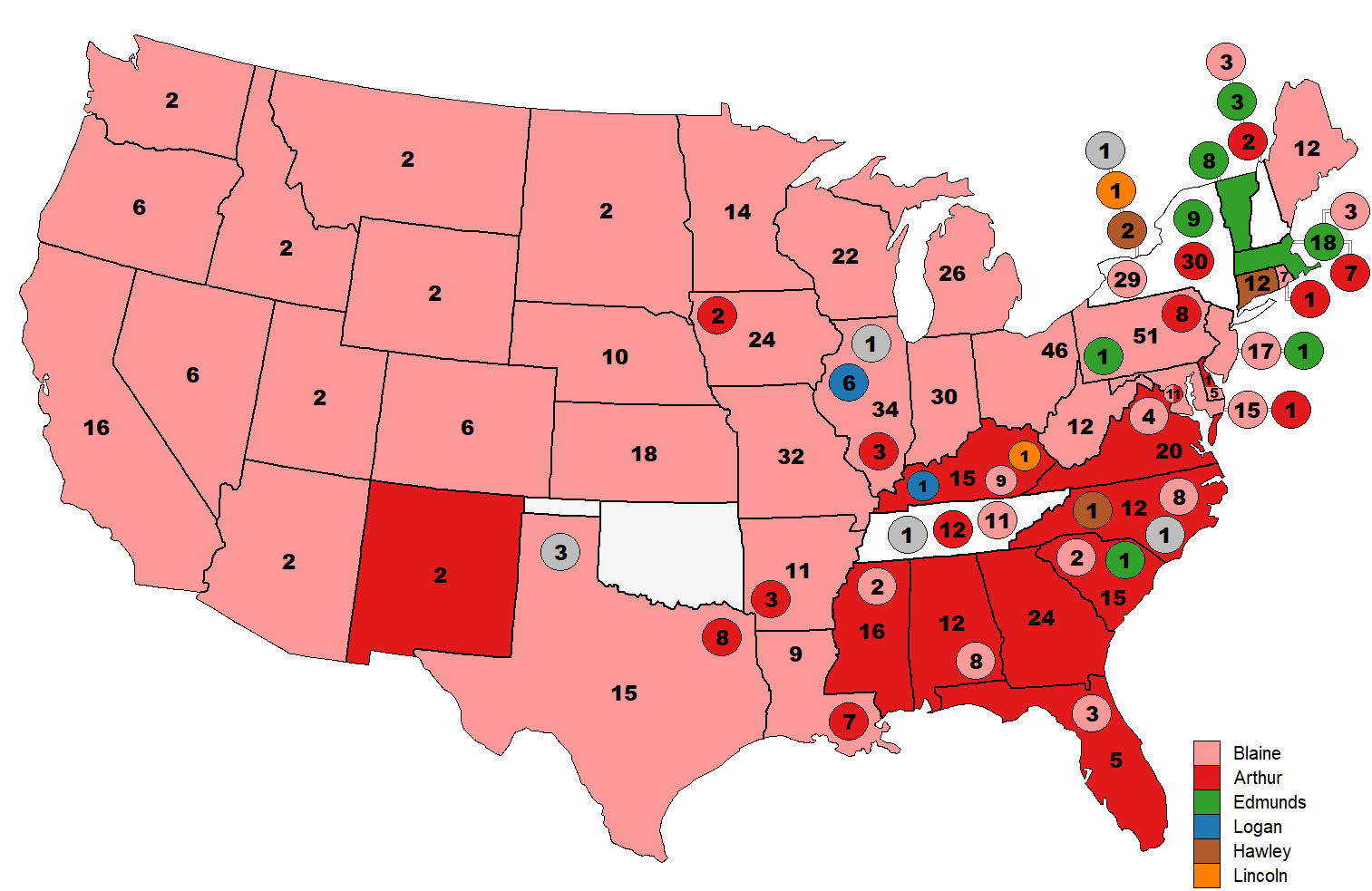
4th Presidential Ballot

== Vice-presidential nomination ==
=== Vice-presidential candidates ===
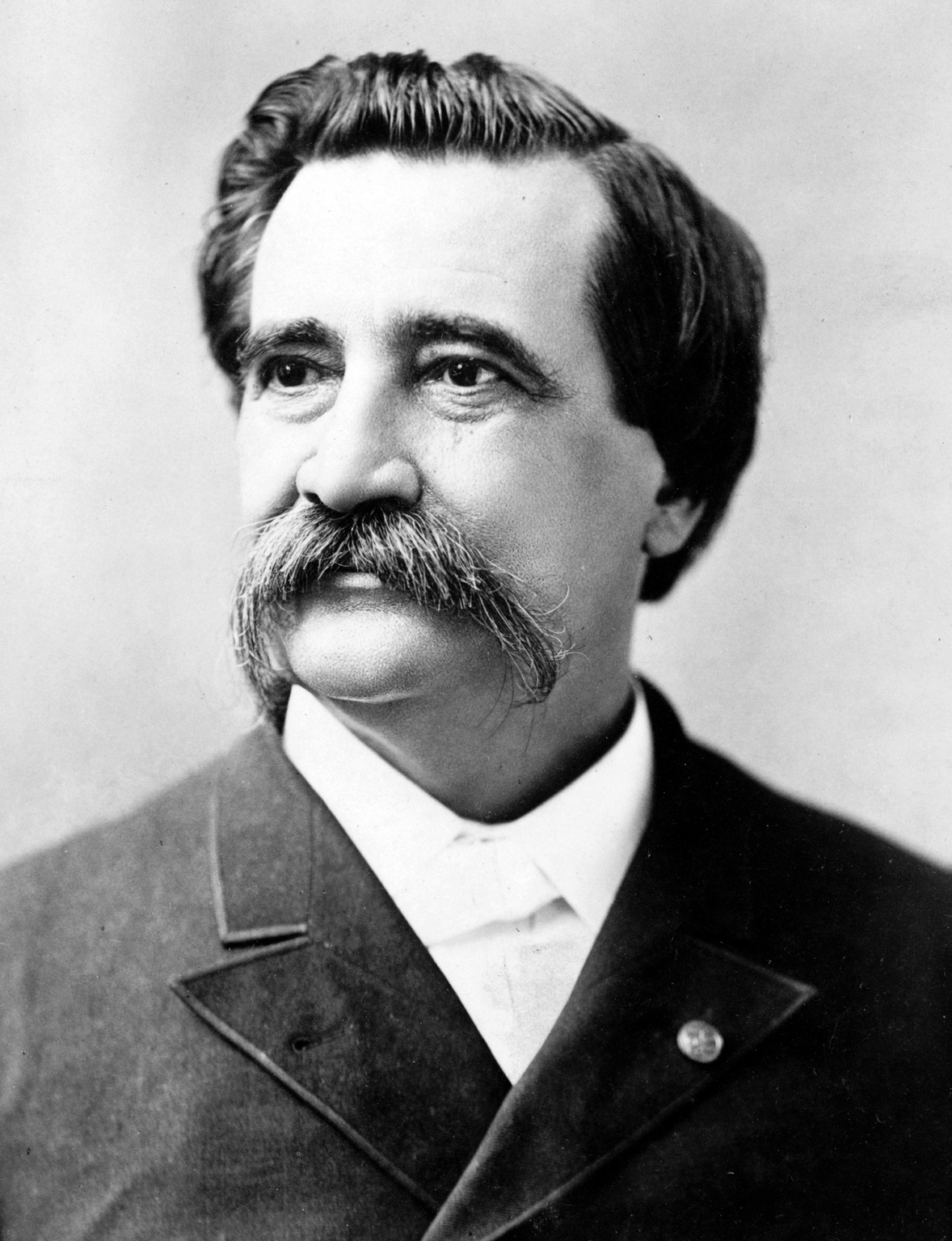
Senator
John A. Logan
from Illinois

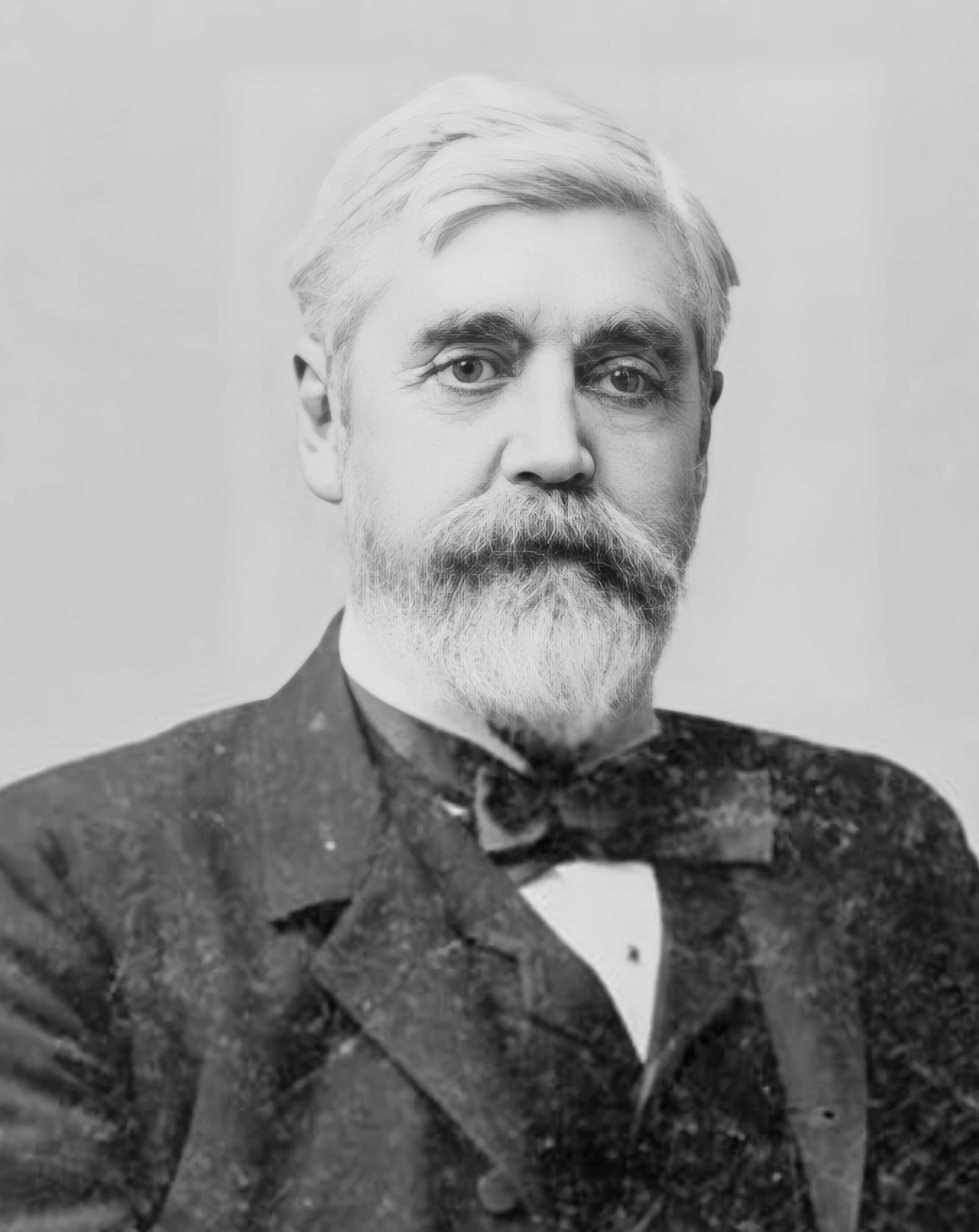
Postmaster General
Walter Q. Gresham
of Indiana
(Not nominated)

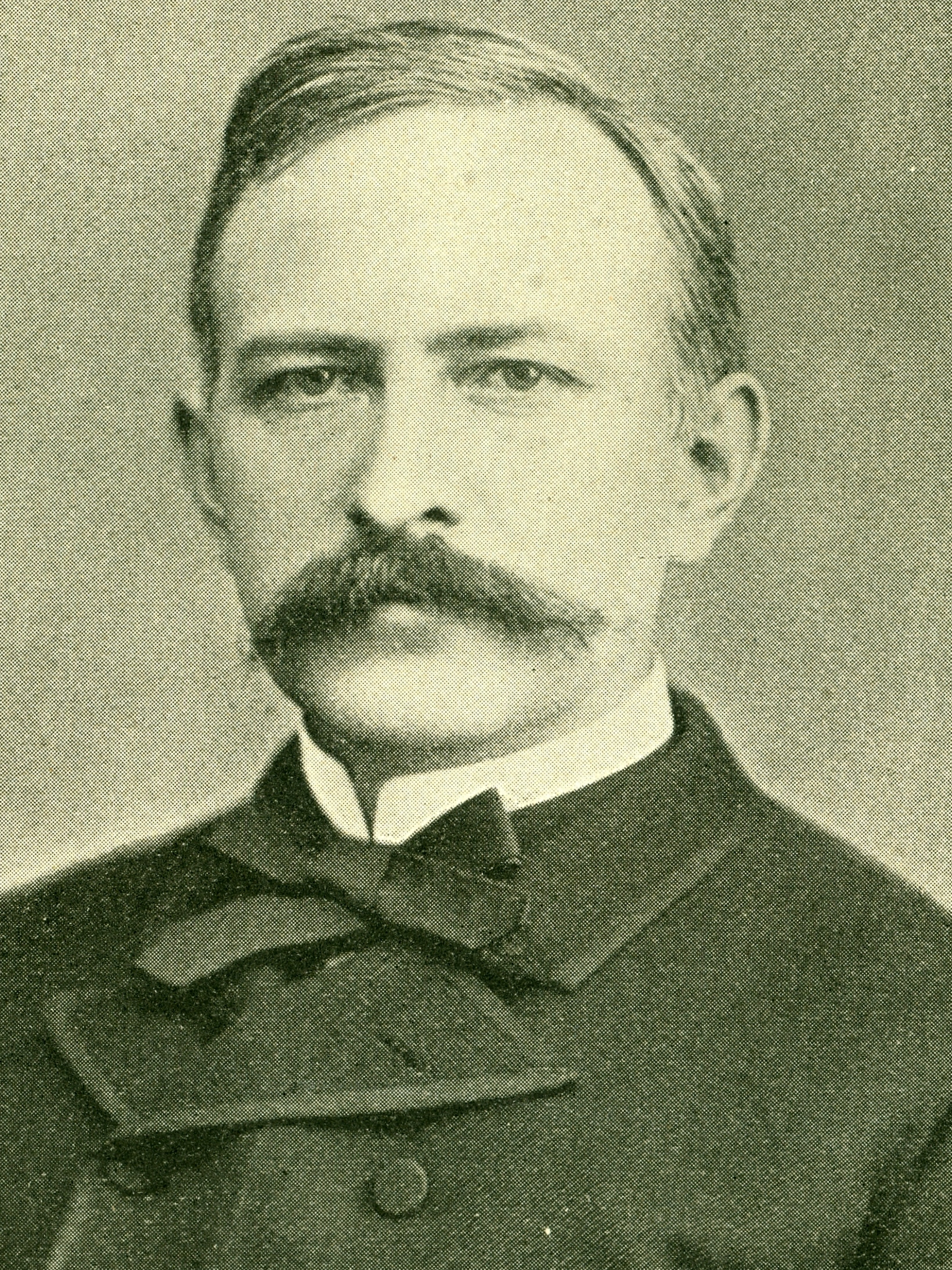
Gubernatorial Candidate
Joseph B. Foraker
of Ohio
(Not nominated)

In the evening of the day of Blaine's nomination, Logan was selected to be the Republican vice presidential nominee.

Vice-presidential ballot
Candidate	1st
Logan	779
Gresham	6
Foraker	1
Not voting	34

Vice-presidential balloting / 4th Day of convention (June 6, 1884)

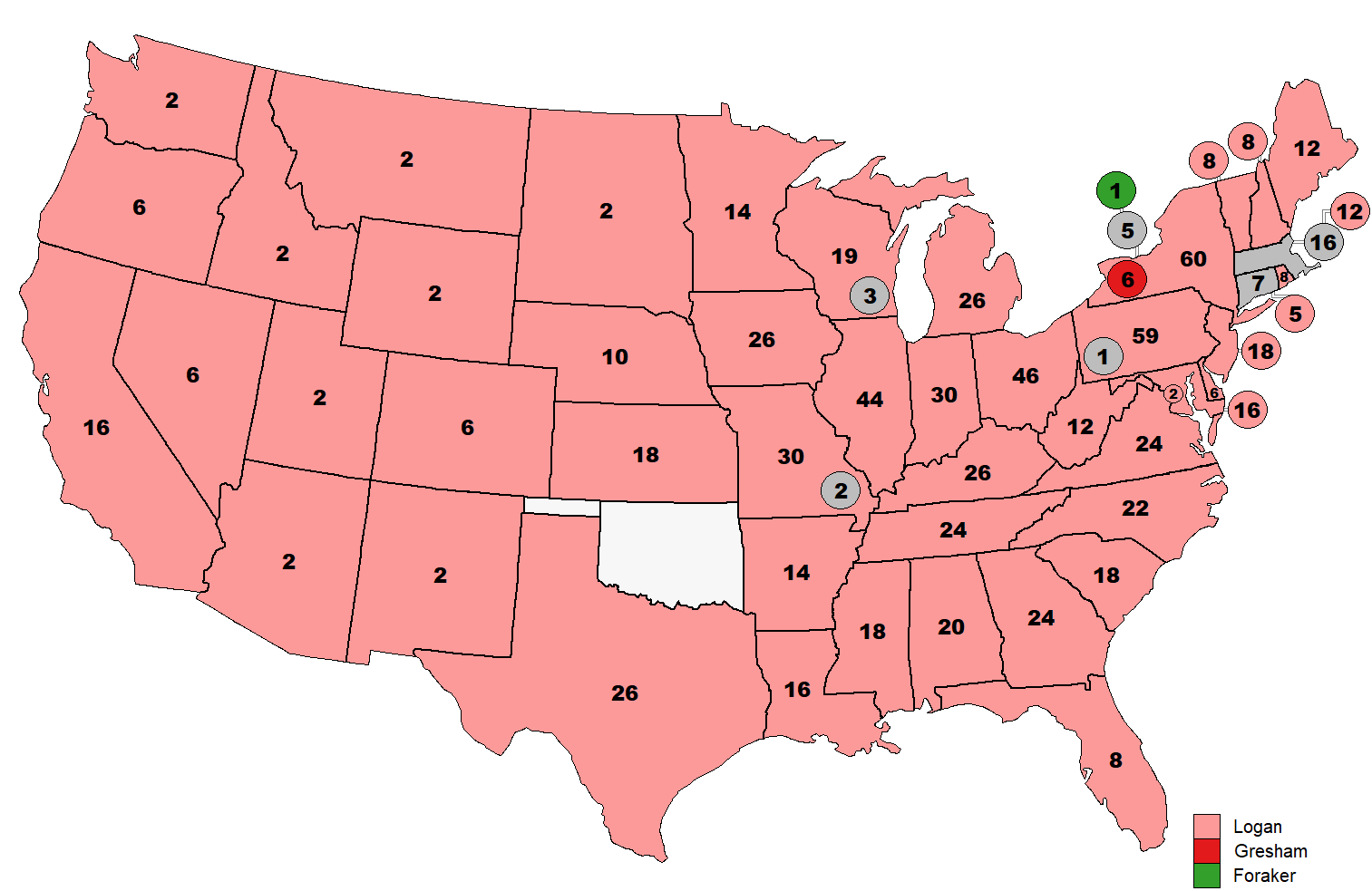
1st
Vice-presidential ballot

== See also ==
- List of Republican National Conventions
- 1884 United States presidential election
- United States presidential nominating convention
- History of the United States Republican Party
- 1884 Democratic National Convention

Preceded by 1880; Chicago	Republican National Conventions	Succeeded by 1888; Chicago
