= John R. Lynch =

American politician (1847–1939)

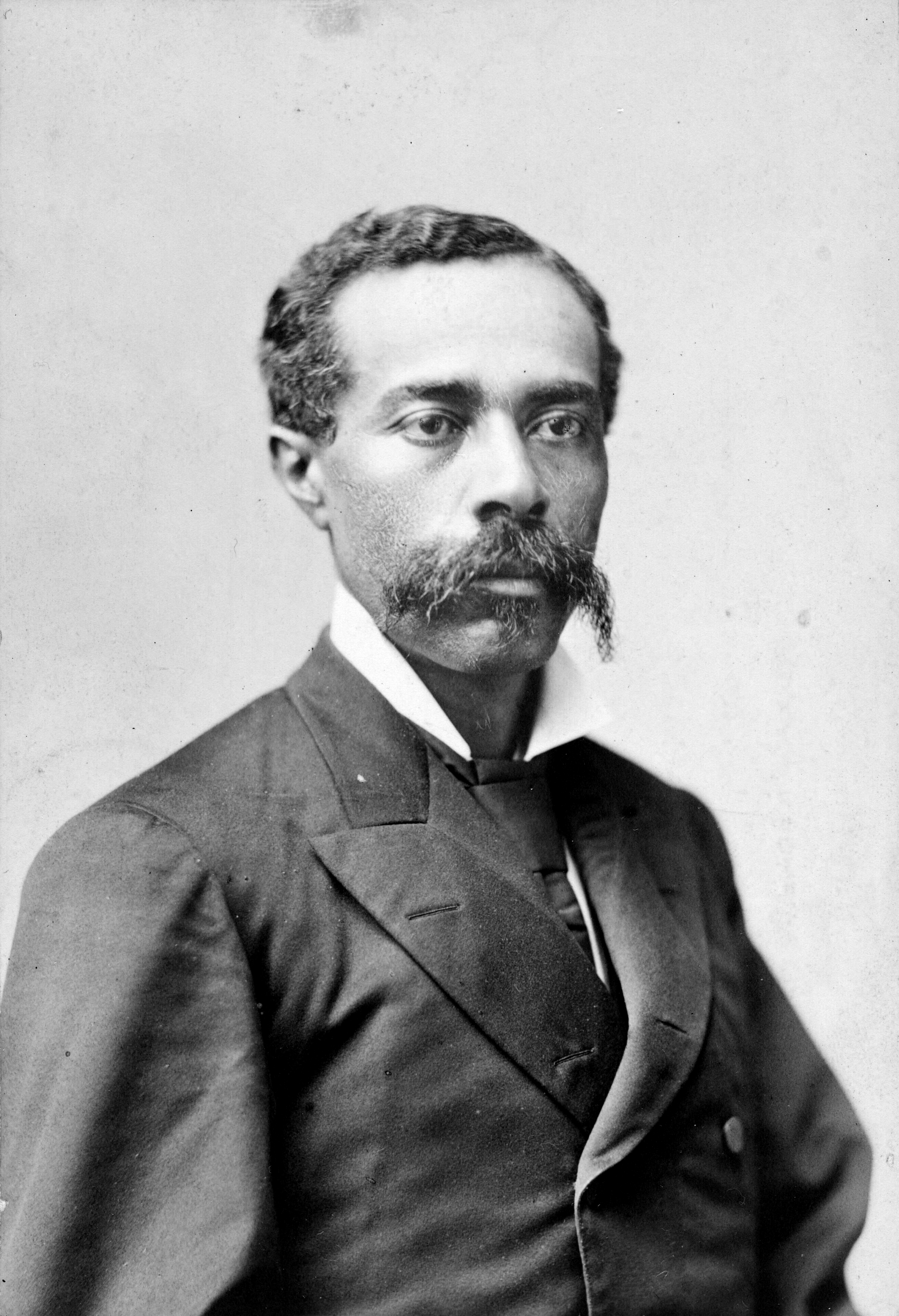
- Portrait by C. M. Bell c. 1882

Member of the U.S. House of Representatives from Mississippi's 6th district
- In office April 29, 1882 – March 4, 1883
- Preceded by: James R. Chalmers
- Succeeded by: Henry Smith Van Eaton
- In office March 4, 1873 – March 4, 1877
- Preceded by: Constituency established
- Succeeded by: James R. Chalmers

33rd Speaker of the Mississippi House of Representatives
- In office 1872–1873
- Preceded by: Henry Waterman Warren
- Succeeded by: Hugh McQueen Street

Member of the Mississippi House of Representatives from the Adams County district
- In office 1869–1873

Personal details
- Born: John Roy Lynch; September 10, 1847 Vidalia, Louisiana, U.S.
- Died: November 2, 1939 (aged 92) Chicago, Illinois, U.S.
- Party: Republican

Military service
- Allegiance: United States
- Branch/service: United States Army
- Years of service: 1898–1911
- Rank: Major
- Battles/wars: Spanish–American War

John Roy Lynch (September 10, 1847 – November 2, 1939) was an American writer, attorney, military officer, author, and Republican politician who served as Speaker of the Mississippi House of Representatives and represented Mississippi in the United States House of Representatives.

Lynch was born into slavery in Louisiana and became free in 1863 under the Emancipation Proclamation. During Reconstruction, Lynch became a prominent political leader in Mississippi. In 1873, Lynch was elected as the first African-American Speaker of the Mississippi House of Representatives; he is considered the first Black man to hold this position in any state. He was among the first generation of African Americans from the South elected to the U.S. House of Representatives and served in the 44th, 45th, and 47th Congresses. In 1884, he was elected temporary chair of the Republican National Convention and delivered the convention's keynote address.

After Democrats regained power in the Mississippi legislature, they disenfranchised much of the majority-black electorate by raising barriers to voter registration. Lynch then studied law and was admitted to the Mississippi bar in 1896. Seeing the effects of disenfranchisement, Lynch left the state and returned to Washington, D.C. to practice law. He served in the United States Army during the Spanish–American War and for a decade into the early 1900s, achieving the rank of major. After retiring, Lynch moved to Chicago, where he lived for more than two decades and was active in law and real estate.

Beginning with the end of federal Reconstruction in 1877, Lynch wrote and published four books analyzing the political situation in the South. The best known of these is The Facts of Reconstruction (1913), which argued against the prevailing view of the Dunning School, conservative white historians who downplayed African-American contributions and the achievements of the Reconstruction era.

== Early life and education ==
John R. Lynch was born into slavery in 1847 on Tacony Plantation near Vidalia, Concordia Parish, Louisiana. He was the third son of his mother Catherine White, who was enslaved. She had four boys in total. Born in Virginia, she was of mixed race, as were both of her parents, Robert and Elizabeth White. Under slavery law, the children of slave mothers were slaves, regardless of paternity. John's father Patrick Lynch was the overseer on the plantation; he had a common-law marriage with Catherine White. A young immigrant, Patrick Lynch had come to the United States with his family from Dublin, Ireland. They settled in Zanesville, Ohio.

As young men, Patrick and his older brother Edward Lynch moved South; Patrick became an overseer at the Tacony Plantation. There he fell in love with Catherine and they became a couple, living together as man and wife. (They were prohibited from marrying by state law.)

To protect his family, Patrick Lynch planned to buy Catherine and their mixed-race sons from the Tacony Plantation owner. Before the transaction was completed, a new owner bought the plantation and hired a different manager. Lynch could no longer afford to post the $1,000 bond required by the legislature for each person in his family in order to free them. (The state legislature was trying to reduce the number of free people of color, and it severely restricted the number of manumissions, ending approval altogether in 1852.) In addition, he would have to submit a request for these manumissions to an Emancipation Court.

Lynch planned to move with his family to New Orleans, where his brother Edward lived, and try to save money there to secure his family's freedom. He thought the city would be a good place to live, as he had learned that it had a large population of free people of color. Many had achieved some education and economic status. Lynch died in 1849 of illness before carrying out his plan.

Before his death, Patrick Lynch arranged for his friend, William G. Deal, to take title of Catherine, William and John, with the understanding that this was a legality to protect the family, who continued to work at Tacony plantation. But after a time, Deal sold them to Alfred Vidal Davis, a planter in Natchez, Mississippi. When she met Davis, Catherine was shocked to learn of the sale. She told him her family's story. Davis offered to keep her and her two sons with her (one had died by this time), and to have her work in his household. He also allowed her to hire out and save some of the money she earned. He mostly kept his word, but Catherine and her two sons did not gain freedom until 1863, under the Emancipation Proclamation. Because of an argument with Mrs. Davis, the boy John Lynch had been sent to field labor on the plantation. He was 16 when he and his family gained freedom.

Lynch worked with elements of the Union Army in the Natchez area. After the Civil War ended in 1865, a friend of his father's arranged for him to work for a photographer. At the photographer's studio he met Robert H. Wood; Lynch and Wood would have a lifelong friendship, and Wood also went on to serve political office. Lynch took on increased responsibilities until he managed the entire operation and its finances. He built a successful business in Natchez. Wanting to continue his education, Lynch attended a night school taught by Northerners. (By the end of 1866, many such teachers were driven out of the state by whites' violent opposition to the education of freedmen.) Lynch also read widely in books and newspapers during lulls in his business day. As Lynch's business was near a white school, the young man often eavesdropped on lessons through the open windows.

== Career ==
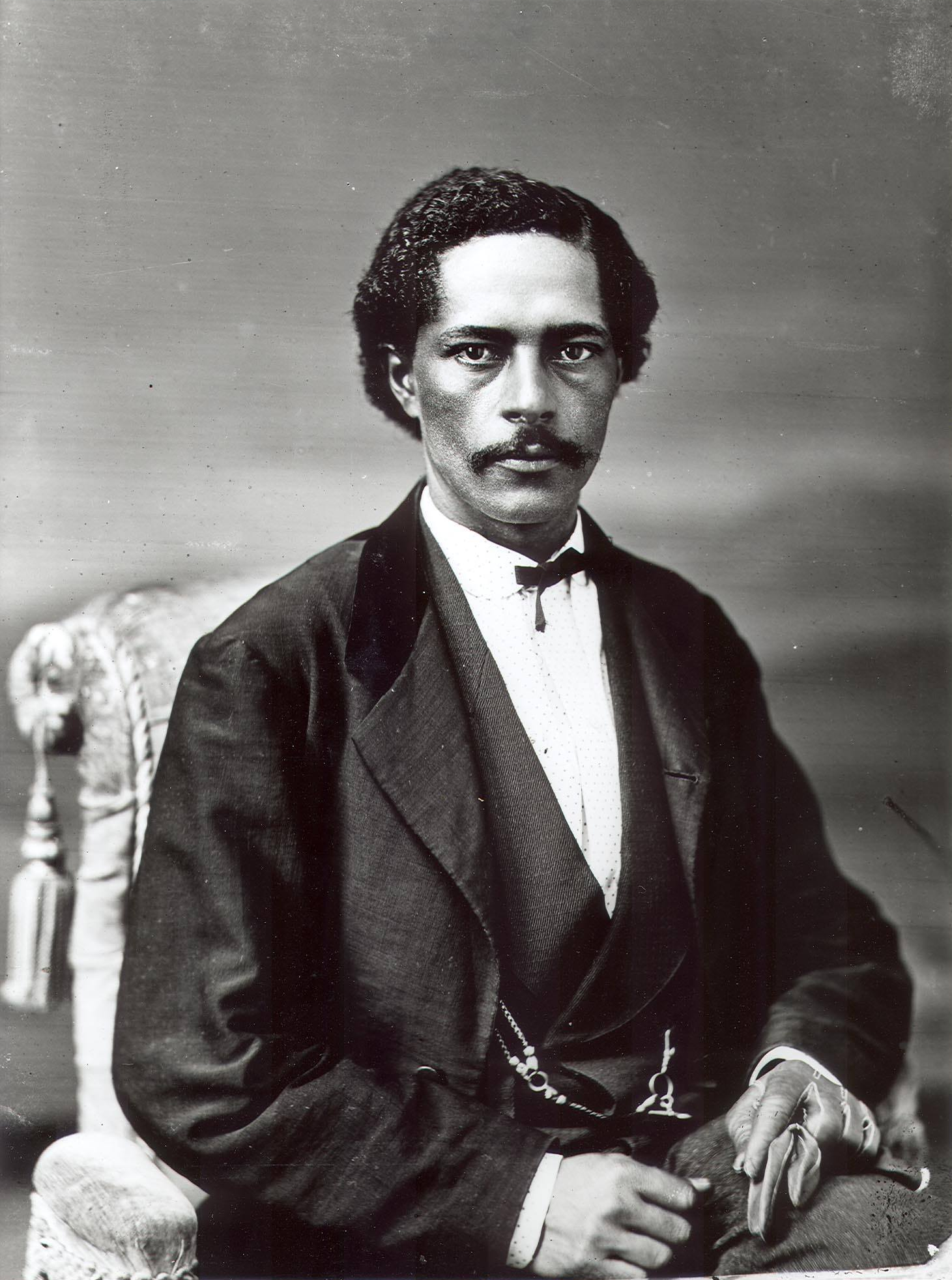
Lynch c. 1873–1883

Lynch's leadership abilities were quickly recognized in Natchez, and he gained post-war political opportunities. He became active in the Republican Party by the age of 20. Although too young to participate as a delegate, he attended the state's constitutional convention of 1867, studying its developments closely. The first proposed constitution was defeated, largely because it required the temporary disenfranchisement of former Confederates, an unpopular proposal.

In April 1869 at the age of 22, Lynch was appointed by the military governor, Adelbert Ames, as a Justice of the Peace in Natchez. Later that year Lynch was elected as a Republican to the Mississippi State House. He was re-elected, serving until 1873. In his last term, January 1872 he was elected as Speaker of the Mississippi House, the first African American to achieve that position. His bid for Speaker was contentious, and it was only after Senator James Alcorn convinced some white Republicans to support him that Lynch secured the position. Despite this, W.E.B. Du Bois records in Black Reconstruction in America that Lynch was "presented with a gold watch and chain" at the end of the session and thanked for "his dignity, impartiality, and courtesy as a presiding officer" by a prominent Democratic representative.

At the age of 26 in 1872, Lynch was elected as the youngest member of the US Congress from Mississippi's 6th congressional district, as part of the first generation of African-American Congressmen. (This district was created by the state legislature in 1870.) He was the only African American elected from Mississippi for a century.

In 1874 Lynch was the only Republican in the Mississippi House delegation to be elected in the face of a Democratic campaign against Republicans and blacks. Elections in the state were increasingly accompanied by violence and fraud as Democrats worked to regain political power. In 1874, the White League, a white paramilitary group active on behalf of the Democratic Party, had worked openly to intimidate and suppress black voting, assassinating blacks and running Republican officers out of town. In 1875 Democrats dominated the House of Representatives for the first time since the Civil War.

Lynch introduced many bills and argued on their behalf. Perhaps his greatest effort was in the long debate supporting the Civil Rights Act of 1875 to ban discrimination in public accommodations. He was one of seven African-American Congressmen present, who all testified in 1874 as to personal and known experience of the effects of discrimination in this area.

Maintaining that the legislation would not force blacks and whites to mix socially, as southern Democrats feared, Lynch said, "It is not social rights that we desire. We have enough of that already. What we ask for is protection in the enjoyment of public rights—rights that are or should be accorded to every citizen alike.

Another speech included the following:

They were faithful and true to you then; they are no less so today. And yet they ask no special favors as a class; they ask no special protection as a race. They feel that they purchased their inheritance, when upon the battlefields of this country, they watered the tree of liberty with the precious blood that flowed from their loyal veins. They ask no favors, they desire; and must have; an equal chance in the race of life.

In 1876 Lynch spoke out against the White League and racial divisions in his state. The Democratic Party dominated the state legislature, redrawing his district and guaranteeing white majorities in the other five. Lynch contested the victory of Democrat James R. Chalmers from the 6th district, but, with Congress dominated by Democrats, the Elections Committee refused to hear the case. As a result of a national Democratic Party compromise, in 1877 the federal government withdrew its troops from the South, and Reconstruction was considered ended. The Democrats kept control of the state legislature.

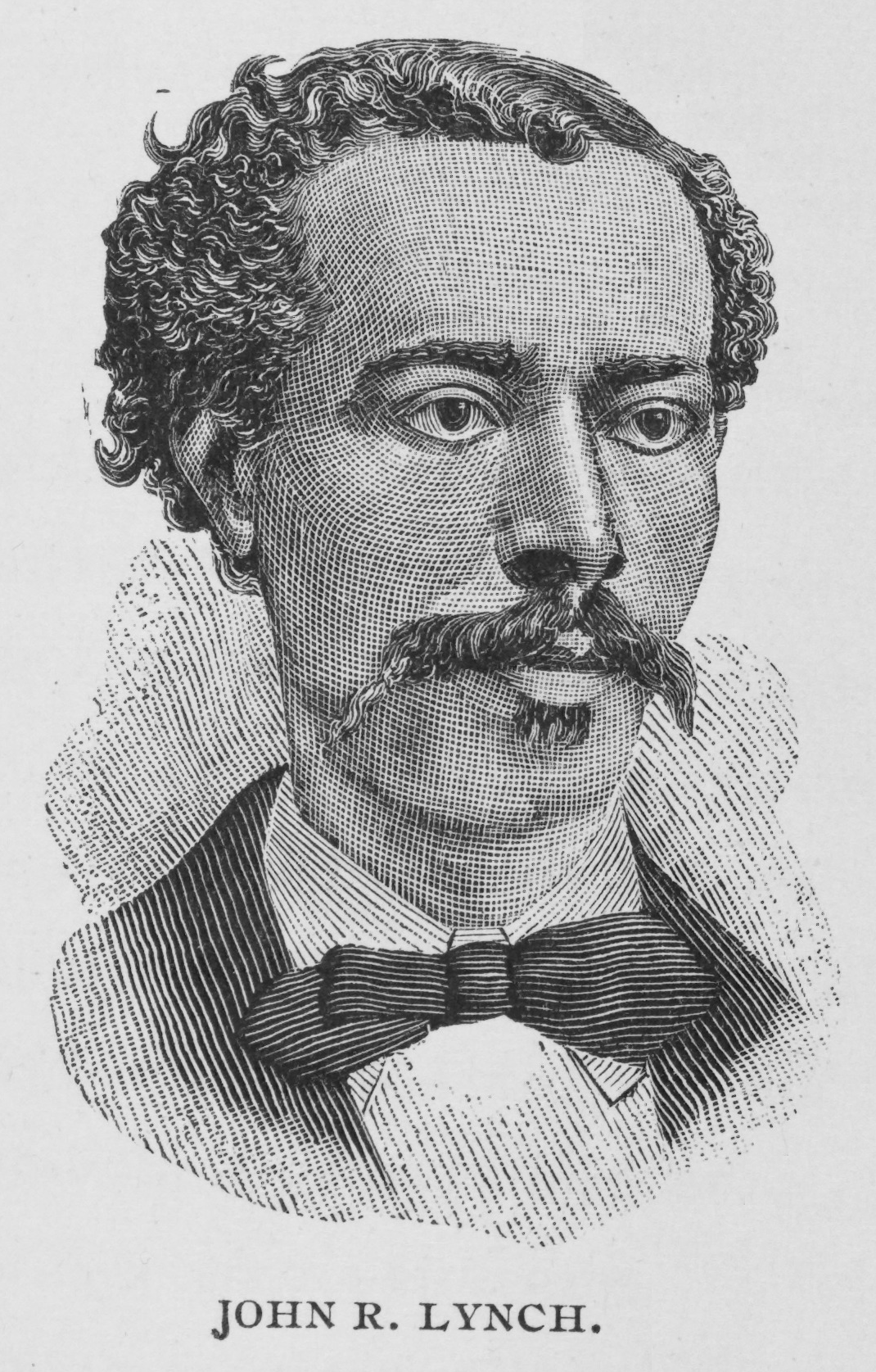
Engraving of Lynch from 1887

In 1880 Lynch re-entered politics. He ran against Democrat James R. Chalmers from the 6th district and contested his claim of victory in the majority-black 6th district.

When his case came before the Committee on Elections on April 27, 1882, Lynch argued that in five counties, more than 5,000 of his votes had been counted for Chalmers. He further asserted that several thousand Republican ballots had been thrown out after a secret hearing because of technicalities such as a clerical failure to send a list of names with the returns and the presence of unusual marks on the ballots. Lynch's strongest arguments were based on Chalmers's remarks that Lynch's votes had been thrown out and that he (Chalmers) was 'in favor of using every means short of violence to preserve [for] intelligent white people of Mississippi supreme control of political affairs.' The committee ruled in Lynch's favor, and on April 29, 1882, the House voted 125 to 83 to seat him; 62 Members abstained.

Lynch was awarded the seat by Congress in 1882.

He had little time to campaign and lost re-election in 1882 by 600 votes, ending his career in Congress. He continued to have influence in Mississippi and in the Republican Party.

In 1884, Lynch became the first African American to chair a political party's National Convention. Future president Theodore Roosevelt made a moving speech nominating Lynch as Temporary Chairman of the 1884 Republican National Convention in Chicago, Illinois. As temporary chair, Lynch delivered the keynote address of the convention. He served as a member of the Republican National Committee for Mississippi from 1884 to 1889.

== Marriage and family ==
In 1884, at the age of 37, Lynch married Ella Sommerville; they had a daughter before divorcing. Years later, in 1911, after Lynch retired from the Army, he married again, to Cora Williams. They left Mississippi the following year, part of the Great Migration to Northern industrial cities, and settled in Chicago. They lived there until Lynch's death in 1939.

== Later political and military career ==
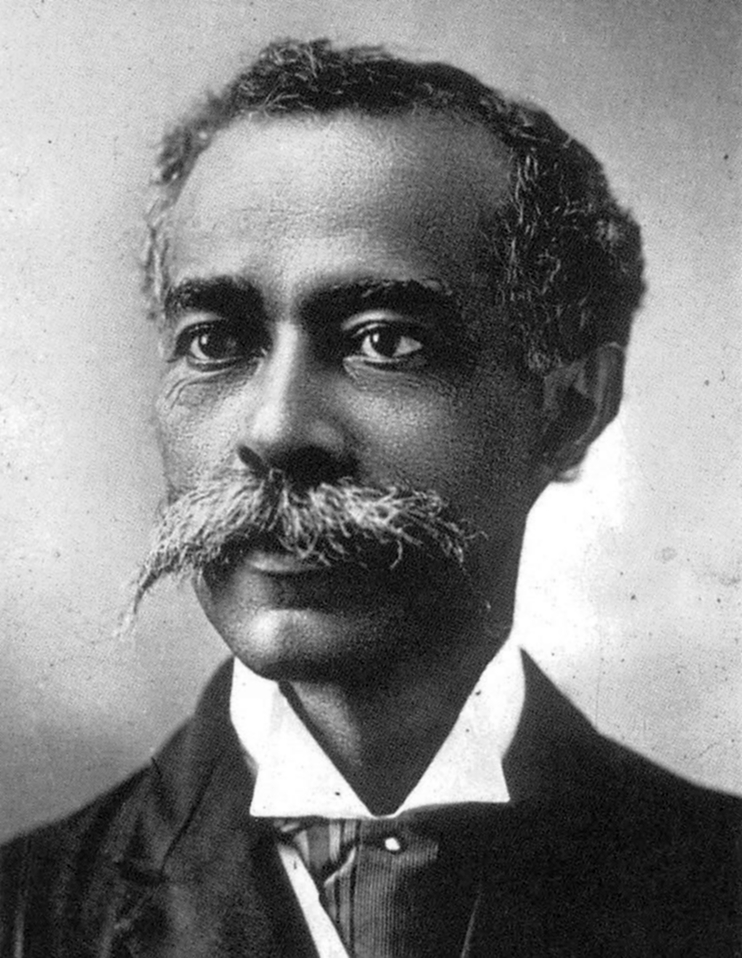
Lynch c. 1893

Lynch was appointed by the Republican national administration as Treasury Auditor of the Department of Navy (1889–1893). He returned to Mississippi after this and studied law; he passed the state bar in 1896. As the state legislature had disenfranchised blacks by its new 1890 constitution, based on poll taxes and literacy tests, Lynch returned to Washington, DC the following year to set up his law practice. He wanted to live where he could participate politically.

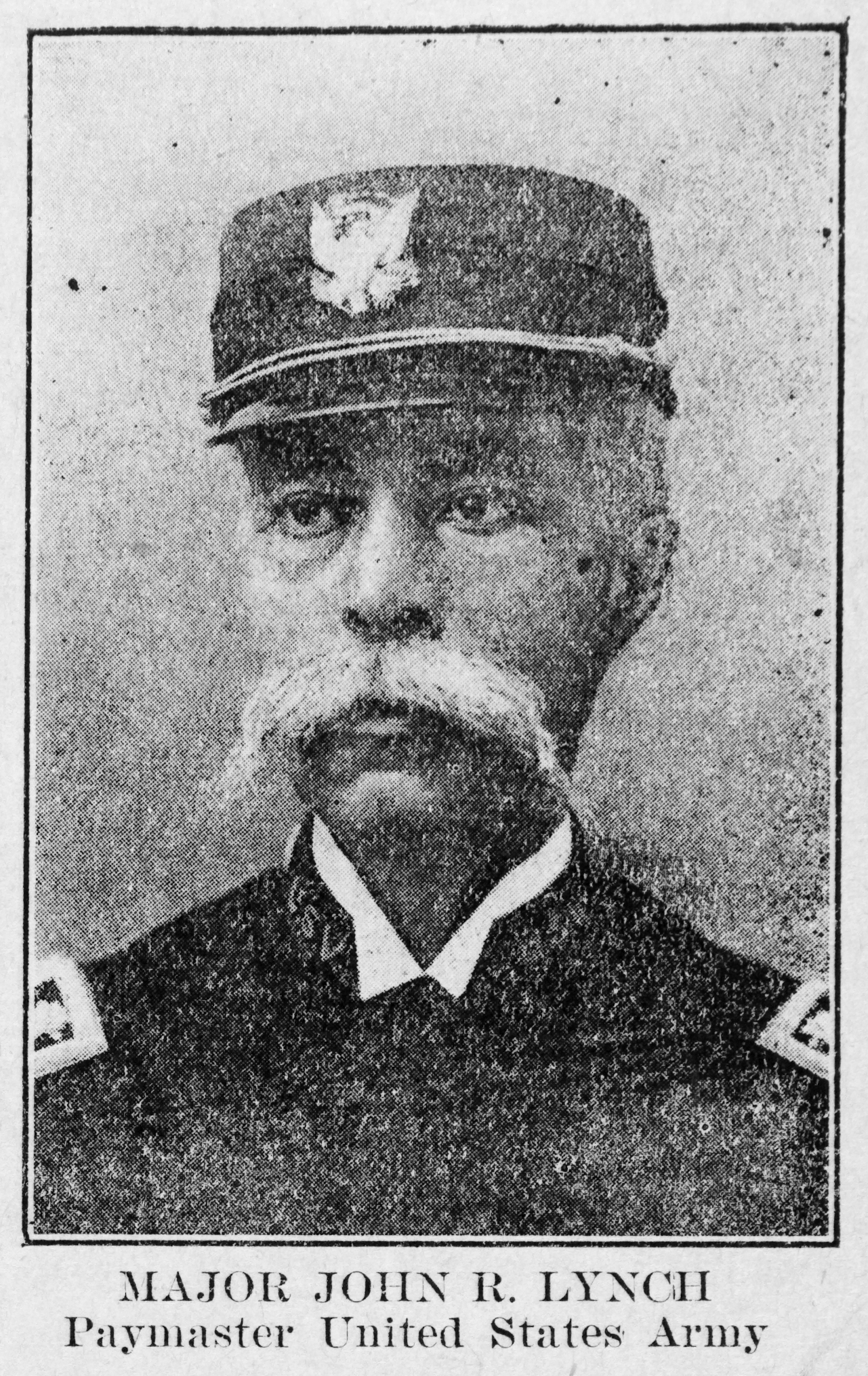
Major Lynch in uniform c. 1908

During the Spanish–American War, Lynch was commissioned in 1898 as a major and appointed as paymaster in the Army by President William McKinley. In 1901, Lynch entered the Regular Army as a captain. He was promoted to major and served tours of duty in the United States, Cuba, and the Philippines.

After Lynch retired from the Army in 1911, he married again and moved to Chicago in 1912. There he set up his law practice. He also became involved in real estate, as the city became a destination of tens of thousands of rural blacks in the Great Migration, including many from Mississippi. It was also attracting European immigrants and rapidly expanding based on its industrial jobs.

After his death in Chicago in 1939 at the age of 92, Lynch was buried with military honors in Arlington National Cemetery, due to his service as a Congressman and military officer.

== Lynch's writings ==
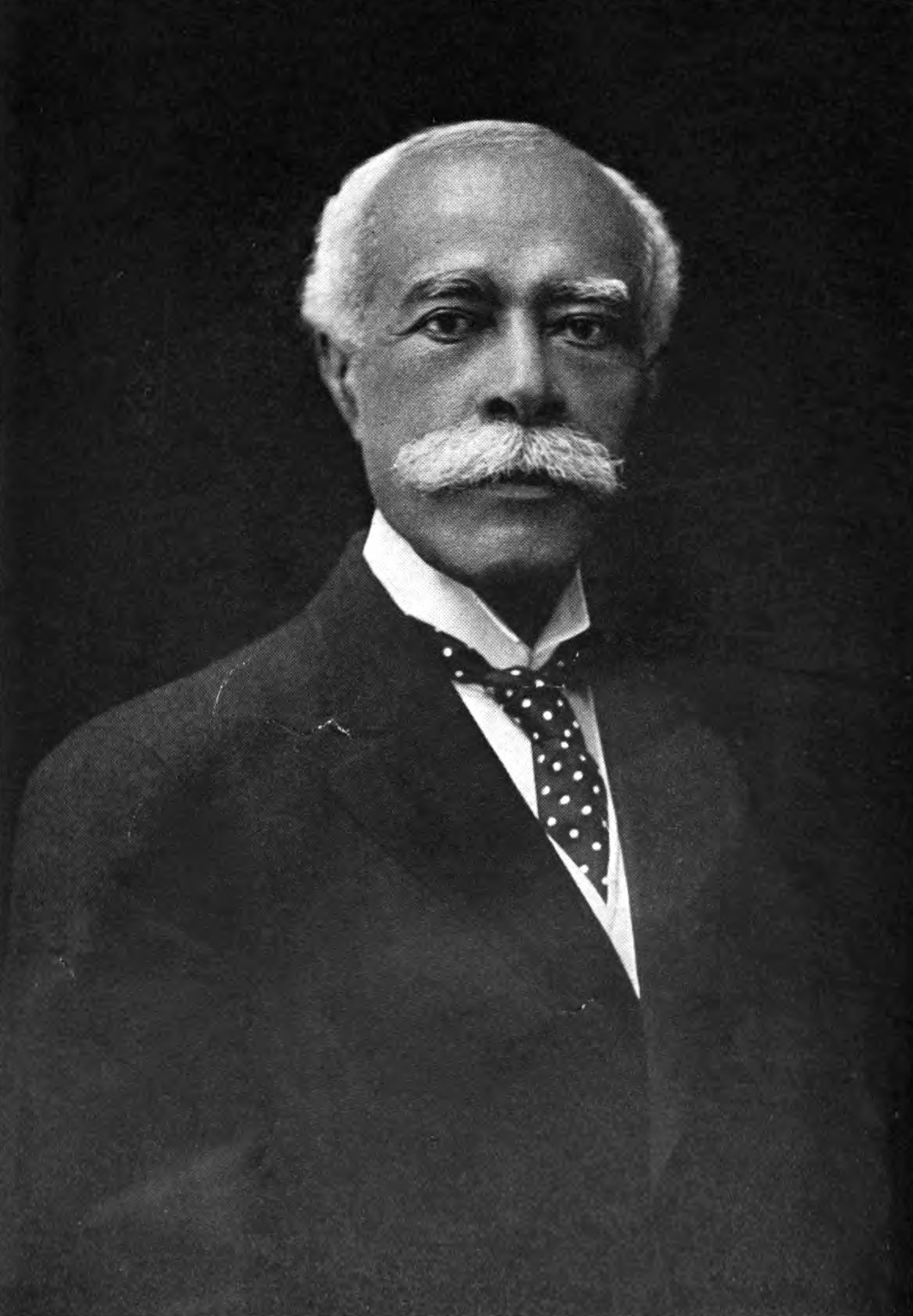
Portrait of Lynch from his 1913 book

At the turn of the 20th century, the struggle for memory and meaning of the Civil War and Reconstruction continued. Lynch wrote a book, The Facts of Reconstruction (1913), and several articles criticizing the then-dominant Dunning School of historiography. Dunning and followers, many of whom were prominent in major Southern universities, evaluated Reconstruction largely from the viewpoint of white former slave owners and ex-Confederates; they expressed the discriminatory views of their societies. They routinely downplayed any positive contributions of African Americans during Reconstruction, said they were dominated by white carpetbaggers, and could not manage political power. (This was in keeping with the disfranchisement of blacks throughout the former Confederacy from 1890 to 1910, and the imposition by state legislatures of racial segregation and Jim Crow law to restore white supremacy.)

Lynch argued that blacks had made substantial contributions during the period. He also published articles on this topic in 1917 and 1918 in the Journal of Negro History. His views were later supported by historians such as W.E.B. Du Bois in his Black Reconstruction in America (1935) and Eric Foner in Reconstruction: America's Unfinished Revolution, 1863–1877 (1988), among others. Since the late 20th century, new histories and research have changed the perception of the achievements during Reconstruction.

The Facts of Reconstruction is freely available online, courtesy of the Gutenberg Project. Since Lynch participated directly in Reconstruction-era governments, historians consider his book to be a primary source in study of the period.

Lynch's memoir, Reminiscences of an Active Life: The Autobiography of John Roy Lynch, which he worked on near the end of his life, was not published until 1970. A number of chapters dealing with Reconstruction are close to material published first in his 1913 The Facts of Reconstruction. A new edition of his memoir was issued by the University of Mississippi Press in 2008. Much is available for preview online at Google books.

=== Books ===
- Colored Americans: John R. Lynch's Appeal To Them. Milwaukee: Allied Printing, [1900?]
- The Facts of Reconstruction (New York, 1913)
- Some Historical Errors of James Ford Rhodes. Boston: The Cornhill Publishing Co., 1922 (reprint of articles first published in the Journal of Negro History in 1917 and 1918).
- Reminiscences of an Active Life: The Autobiography of John Roy Lynch (ed. John Hope Franklin) (Chicago, 1970).

=== Articles ===
- John R. Lynch, "Some Historical Errors of James Ford Rhodes", The Journal of Negro History, Vol. 2, No. 4, Oct., 1917
- Pittsburgh Courier article, February 22, 1930.

=== Speeches ===
- The Late Election in Mississippi (Washington: Government Printing Office, 1877).

== See also ==
- Civil rights movement (1865–1896)
- List of African-American United States representatives
- List of United States representatives from Mississippi
- U.S. House election, 1872
- U.S. House election, 1874
- U.S. House election, 1876
- U.S. House election, 1882

== Bibliography ==
- Behrend, Justin. “Facts, Memories, and History: John R. Lynch and the Memory of Reconstruction in the Age of Jim Crow”, in Carole Emberton and Bruce E. Baker (eds.), Remembering Reconstruction: Struggles Over the Meaning of America's Most Turbulent Era (Baton Rouge, 2017), 84–108.
- Behrend, Justin. Reconstructing Democracy: Black Grassroots Politics in the Deep South after the Civil War (Athens, Georgia Press, 2015).
- Bell, Frank C. "The Life and Times of John R. Lynch: A Case Study 1847–1939", Journal of Mississippi History, 38 (February 1976): 53–67.
- DeSantis, Vincent P. Republican Face the Southern Question: The New Departure Years, 1877-1897 (Baltimore, 1959)
- Foner, Eric ed. "Lynch, John Roy" in Freedom's Lawmakers: A Directory of Black Officeholders During Reconstruction, Revised Edition (Baton Rouge: Louisiana State University Press, 1996). ISBN 0-8071-2082-0.
- Franklin, John Hope. "Lynch, John Roy", in Dictionary of American Negro Biography, edited by Rayford W. Logan and Michael R. Winston, pp. 407–9. New York: W. W. Norton and Co., 1982.
- Franklin, John Hope editor, Reminiscences of an Active Life: The Autobiography of John Roy Lynch (Chicago, 1970).
- Franklin, John Hope. "John Roy Lynch: Republican Stalwart from Mississippi", in Howard Rabinowitz (ed.), Southern Black Leaders of the Reconstruction Era (Urbana, 1982); reprinted in John Hope Franklin, Race and History: Selected Essays, 1938–1988 (Louisiana State University Press, 1989)
- "John Roy Lynch", in Black Americans in Congress, 1870–1989. Prepared under the direction of the Commission on the Bicentenary by the Office of the Historian, U.S. House of Representatives. Washington: Government Printing Office, 1991.
- McLaughlin, James Harold. John R. Lynch, The Reconstruction Politician: A Historical Perspective. Ph.D. diss., Ball State University, 1981.
- Mann, Kenneth Eugene. "John Roy Lynch: U.S. Congressman from Mississippi", Negro History Bulletin, 37 (April/May 1974): 238–41.
- Schweninger, Loren. Black Property Owners in the South 1790–1915 (Urbana, Ill., 1990)
- The Amazing World of John Roy Lynch (Eerdmans Publishing, 2015), a biography for children, written by Chris Barton and illustrated by Don Tate.

U.S. House of Representatives
New constituency	Member of the U.S. House of Representatives from Mississippi's 6th congressional district 1873–1877	Succeeded by James R. Chalmers
Preceded by James R. Chalmers	Member of the U.S. House of Representatives from Mississippi's 6th congressional district 1882–1883	Succeeded by Henry Smith Van Eaton
Party political offices
First	Keynote Speaker of the Republican National Convention; 1884	Vacant Title next held by Warren G. Harding
