= Natchez–Vidalia Bridge =

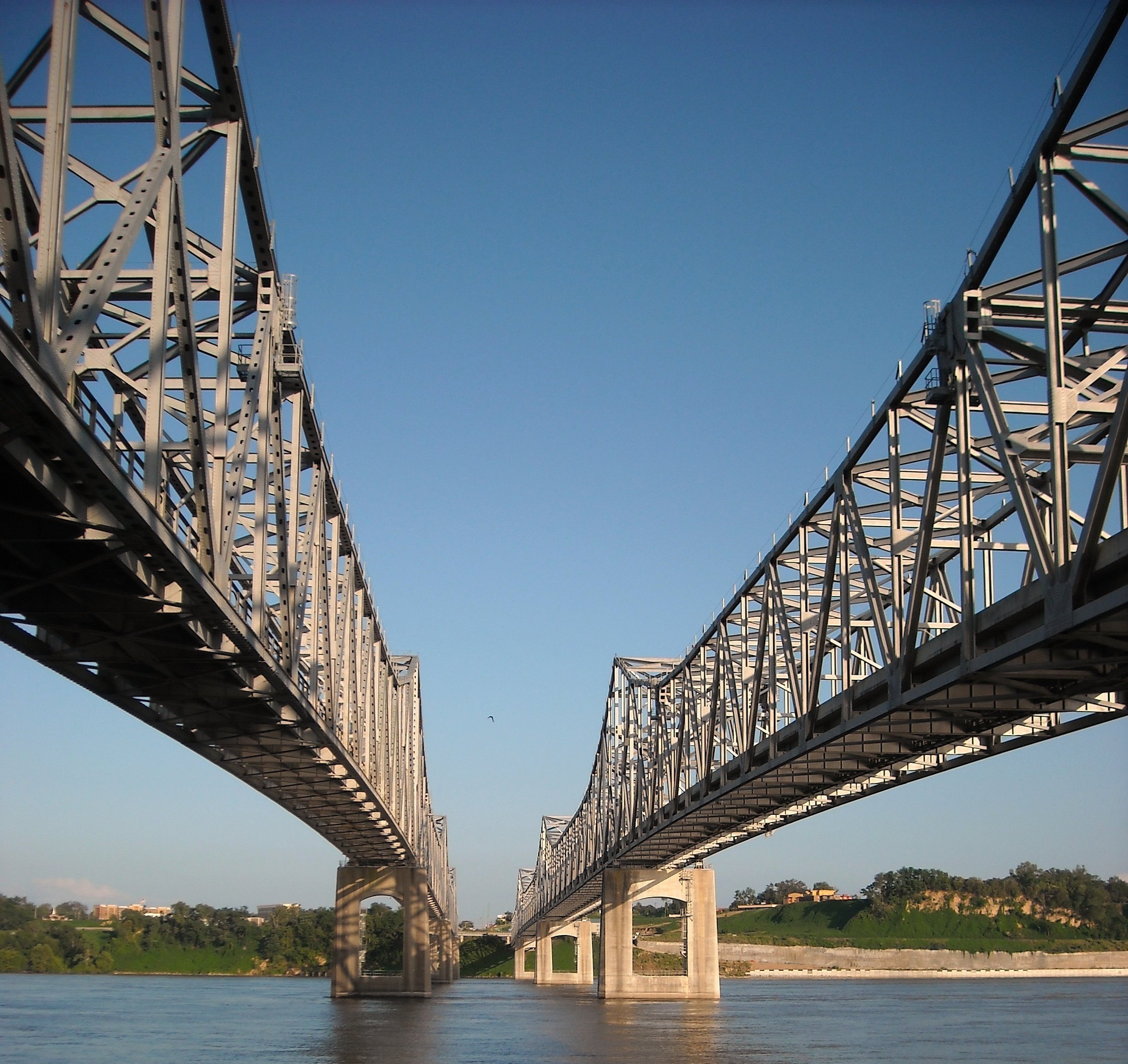
- Coordinates: 31°33′33″N 91°25′09″W
- Carries: 4 lanes of US 84 / US 425
- Crosses: Mississippi River
- Locale: Vidalia, Louisiana and Natchez, Mississippi
- ID number: 21000840010001A (westbound); 21000840010001B (eastbound)

Characteristics
- Design: Twin Cantilever bridges
- Total length: 4,205 feet (1,282 m) (westbound); 4,202 feet (1,281 m) (eastbound)
- Width: 24 feet (7 m) (westbound); 42 feet (13 m) (eastbound)
- Longest span: 3 848 feet (258 m) spans per bridge
- Clearance below: 125 feet (38 m)

History
- Opened: October 1940 (westbound); June 1988 (eastbound)

Statistics
- Daily traffic: 24,000 (2007)

Location
- Interactive map of Natchez–Vidalia Bridge

The Natchez–Vidalia Bridge are twin cantilever bridges carrying U.S. Route 84, and 425 across the Mississippi River between Vidalia, Louisiana and Natchez, Mississippi. It is the tallest bridge in Mississippi (although the demolished Benjamin G. Humphreys Bridge connecting Mississippi with Arkansas was taller by 5 feet, its main spans were located entirely within Arkansas).

The original bridge, built by the Works Progress Administration and completed in September 1940, has only two 8-foot lanes and lacks shoulders. It was originally bidirectional, but now carries all westbound traffic. The newer, eastbound bridge, completed in 1988, has 11-foot lanes with inside and outside shoulders. Eastbound traffic goes into Natchez and connects with US Highway 61, where travelers can continue north to Vicksburg and south to Baton Rouge.

== See also ==
- List of crossings of the Lower Mississippi River
