= Tacony Plantation =

Historic house in Louisiana, United States

- Tacony Plantation House
- U.S. National Register of Historic Places
- Location within Louisiana Location within the United States
- Location: Along Taconey Plantation Road, about 450 yards (410 m) north of US 84, Vidalia, Louisiana
- Coordinates: 31°34′50″N 91°28′26″W
- Area: 9 acres (3.6 ha)
- Built: 1850
- Architectural style: Renaissance, Rococo Revival
- NRHP reference No.: 79001059
- Added to NRHP: April 19, 1979

The Tacony Plantation is a former cotton plantation with a historic mansion in Vidalia, Louisiana, U.S.. It was built in 1850, a decade prior to the American Civil War of 1861–1865, for Alfred Vidal Davis, Sr. (1826-1899). One of his former slaves, John R. Lynch, became a politician after the war.

The plantation house, along with a 9 acres (3.6 ha) area, has been listed on the National Register of Historic Places on April 19, 1979.

== See also ==
- List of plantations in Louisiana
- National Register of Historic Places listings in Concordia Parish, Louisiana
