= The Facts of Reconstruction =

1913 book by John R. Lynch

- Title page for The Facts of Reconstruction (1913)
- Author: John R. Lynch
- Language: English
- Subject: Reconstruction era politics
- Publisher: Neale Publishing Company
- Publication date: 1913
- Publication place: United States

The Facts of Reconstruction is a non-fiction book by John R. Lynch. The book, a rebuttal to critics of Reconstruction era policies in the United States, was first published in 1913.

== Synopsis ==
The Facts of Reconstruction is a rebuttal to the conservative Dunning School of historiography, which argued that the South had been damaged by the efforts of the North at Reconstruction and that the use of the military to advance Reconstruction efforts was a dismissal of American values. Primarily examining his home state of Mississippi, Lynch tracked the history of the Reconstruction era, the presidential election campaigns of 1880 and 1884, and various pieces of voting rights legislation to argue that African Americans had contributed positively to American society as a result of the Reconstruction era. Lynch also criticized James Ford Rhodes' History of the Civil War, 1861–1865 and specifically defended the policies of Mississippi governors Adelbert Ames and James L. Alcorn.

== Development history ==
John R. Lynch was born into slavery in 1847 and was freed in 1863 after Abraham Lincoln signed the Emancipation Proclamation. He entered politics shortly after the end of the Civil War, was elected to the Mississippi House of Representatives in 1869, and was made speaker of the house in 1872. Lynch served in the United States House of Representatives from 1873 to 1877 and again from 1881 to 1883. After leaving the House he remained active in state politics, business, and served in the U.S. Army.

The Facts of Reconstruction arose as a response to the rise of William A. Dunning and the school of thought which shared his name. The Dunning School argued that African American politicians had been manipulated into supporting the Republican Party in order to enrich the North at the expense of the south. The book was published by the Neale Publishing Company in 1913 and received a second printing in 1915. The publisher is notable—Walter Neale, who founded the Neale Publishing Company in 1896, was a noted racist and critic of Reconstruction era policies, however, he regularly published books on both sides of the issue.

== Reception ==
Initial reception to The Facts of Reconstruction was mixed, with the Black press generally viewing the book more positively than reviewers writing for predominantly white publications. Among the book's notable supporters were sociologist and historian W. E. B. Du Bois, African Methodist Episcopal minister Benjamin F. Lee, and civil rights activist Monroe Alpheus Majors. The book received glowing reviews in The Twin City Star and the Los Angeles Evening Express, with the former praising Lynch for avoiding "any features which might be calculated to arouse racial antagonism" and the latter acknowledging it as providing a much-needed alternative viewpoint. The American Missionary, an abolitionist magazine, acknowledged the book as a contrast to the recently released film The Birth of a Nation, writing that "prejudice is a bad historian."

== Legacy ==
Justin Behrend, a historian at the State University of New York, described The Facts of Reconstruction as being an early example of the professionalization of history. The book received renewed recognition in the 1960s after it was republished.
