= Vidalia, Louisiana =

- City
- City of Vidalia
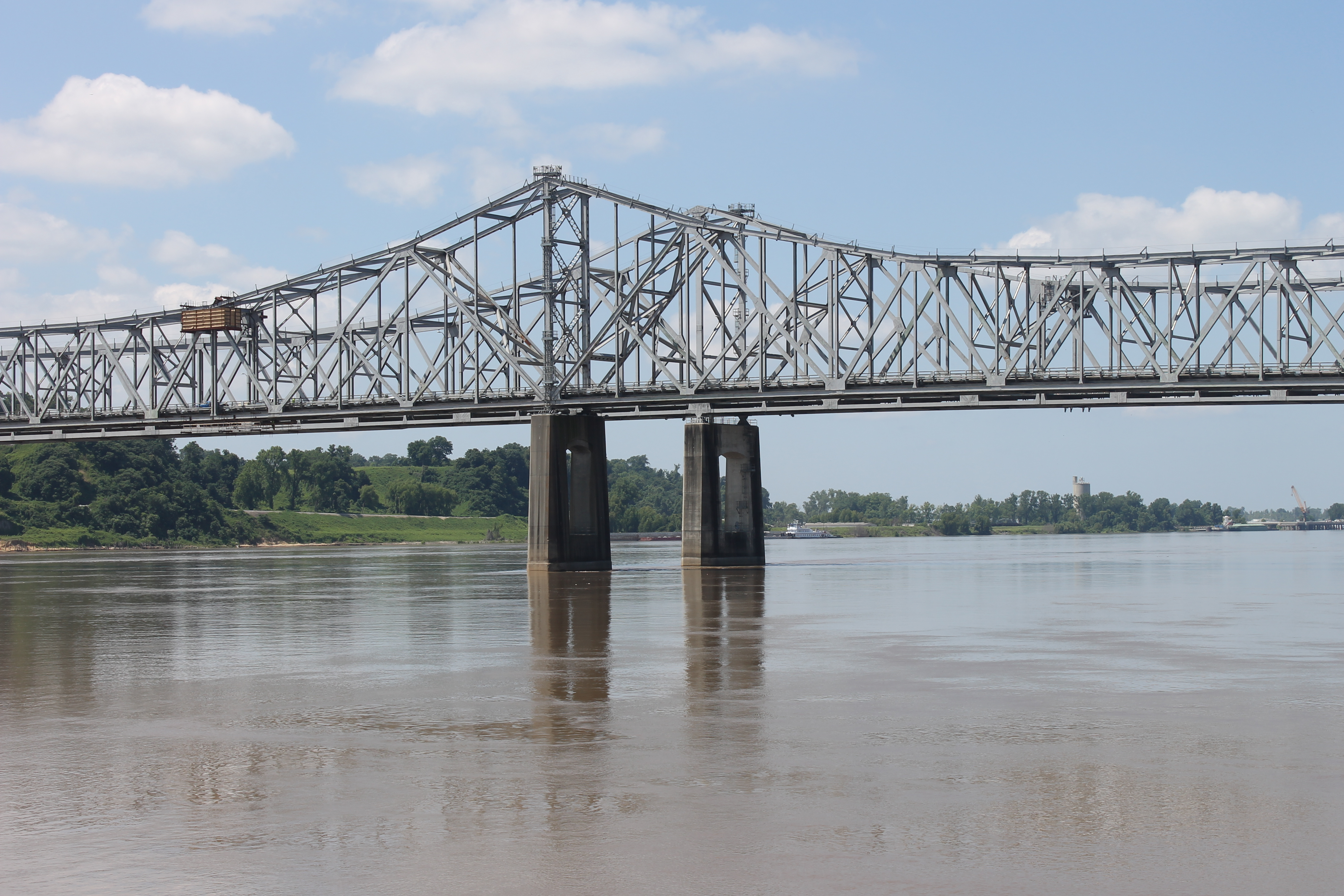
- Natchez-Vidalia Bridge over Mississippi River

- Flag
- Motto: City on the Move
- Location of Vidalia in Concordia Parish, Louisiana.

- Location within Louisiana
- Coordinates: 31°34′00″N 91°26′26″W
- Country: United States
- States: Louisiana
- Parish: Concordia
- Incorporated (town): 1870
- Incorporated (city): 2012

Government
  - Type: Mayor-council government
  - Body: City council

Area
  - Total: 2.59 sq mi (6.72 km^{2})
  - Land: 2.59 sq mi (6.72 km^{2})
  - Water: 0 sq mi (0.00 km^{2})
- Elevation: 59 ft (18 m)

Population (2020)
  - Total: 4,027
  - Density: 1,552.3/sq mi (599.36/km^{2})
- ZIP code: 71373
- FIPS code: 22-78470
- GNIS feature ID: 2406799
- Website: cityofvidaliala.com

Vidalia is the largest city in and the parish seat of Concordia Parish, Louisiana, United States. The population was 4,299 as of the 2010 census.

Vidalia is located on the west bank of the Mississippi River.

The city of Natchez, Mississippi, lies on the opposite bank of the river, connected by the Natchez–Vidalia Bridge, carrying U.S. Routes 65, 84, and 425.

== History ==
Vidalia was founded by Don José Vidal, when he was secretary to Manuel Gayoso de Lemos, the Spanish Governor of the Natchez District from 1792 to 1797. This was in a brief period of Spanish rule of former French territory west of the Mississippi River. Napoleon took it back and he sold it to the United States in the Louisiana Purchase of 1803.

In 1811 the Orleans Territorial legislature changed the name of the city to Vidalia after the founder. Vidal had donated land along the river to the city, where it later constructed its civic buildings. He also donated land for the first school in Concordia Parish.

The Great Sandbar Duel, featuring Jim Bowie, was a formal one-on-one duel that erupted into a violent brawl involving multiple combatants on September 19, 1827. It is a regional legend still told by local residents.

Vidalia is home to Louisiana's first hydroelectric power plant and the largest prefabricated power plant in the world. A total of 41 countries and 21 states collaborated in this historic endeavor, the Sidney A. Murray, Jr. Hydroelectric Station, located in the southern portion of Concordia Parish. The power plant began operation in 1990. The office is located on Texas Street in town.

Hyram Copeland, a Democrat, was repeatedly re-elected; he served as mayor of Vidalia from 1992 to 2016. He is a 2013 inductee of the Louisiana Political Museum and Hall of Fame.

== Geography ==
According to the United States Census Bureau, the city has a total area of 2.6 square miles (6.7 km^{2}), all land.

== Demographics ==
Historical population
Census	Pop.	Note	%±
1880	449		—
1890	821		82.9%
1900	1,022		24.5%
1910	1,345		31.6%
1920	1,246		−7.4%
1930	1,141		−8.4%
1940	1,318		15.5%
1950	1,641		24.5%
1960	4,313		162.8%
1970	5,538		28.4%
1980	5,936		7.2%
1990	4,953		−16.6%
2000	4,543		−8.3%
2010	4,299		−5.4%
2020	4,027		−6.3%
2025 (est.)	3,925	▼	−2.5%
U.S. Decennial Census

=== 2020 census ===
Vidalia racial composition
Race	Number	Percentage
White (non-Hispanic)	2,724	67.64%
Black or African American (non-Hispanic)	1,028	25.53%
Native American	7	0.17%
Asian	48	1.19%
Other/Mixed	80	1.99%
Hispanic or Latino	140	3.48%

As of the 2020 United States census, there were 4,027 people, 1,480 households, and 948 families residing in the town.

=== 2010 census ===
As of the census of 2010, there were 4,299 people, 1,707 households, and 1,186 families residing in the town. The population density was 1,959.7 inhabitants per square mile (756.6/km^{2}). There were 1,910 housing units at an average density of 823.9 per square mile (318.1/km^{2}). The racial makeup of the town was 72.0% White, 26.2% African American, 0.2% Native American, 0.4% Asian, 0.4% from other races, and 0.7% from two or more races. Hispanic or Latino of any race were 1.5% of the population.

There were 1,779 households, out of which 33.4% had children under the age of 18 living with them, 51.5% were married couples living together, 16.5% had a female householder with no husband present, and 27.5% were non-families. 25.4% of all households were made up of individuals, and 11.7% had someone living alone who was 65 years of age or older. The average household size was 2.55 and the average family size was 3.07.

In the town, the population was spread out, with 27.4% under the age of 18, 8.1% from 18 to 24, 26.4% from 25 to 44, 23.0% from 45 to 64, and 15.1% who were 65 years of age or older. The median age was 38 years. For every 100 females, there were 91.2 males. For every 100 females age 18 and over, there were 86.4 males.

The median income for a household in the town was $29,500, and the median income for a family was $36,917. Males had a median income of $31,667 versus $21,455 for females. The per capita income for the town was $14,478. About 17.8% of families and 19.1% of the population were below the poverty line, including 25.2% of those under age 18 and 13.5% of those age 65 or over.

== Arts and culture ==
=== Sites of interest ===
The Tacony Plantation in Vidalia is listed on the National Register of Historic Places.

Vidalia Landing Riverfront Park has landscaped green space, a hotel, convention and conference center; amphitheater; and health facilities: ambulatory care center and acute care facility; a walking/biking trail, and public boat ramps.

With the city's purchase of 70+ acres, Concordia Recreation District #3 constructed a Sports Complex. Municipal Park is also home to the newly constructed City Hall, Police Station, and Fire Department. In addition to municipal services and sports, the park accommodates the Dr. William T. Polk City Park and the Vidalia Community Garden.
