= 1883 Ohio gubernatorial election =

- October 9, 1883
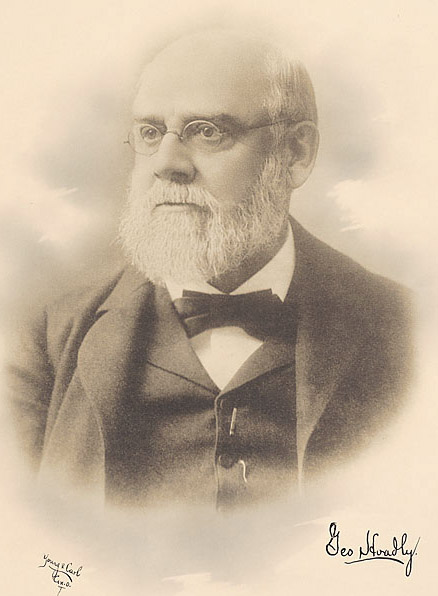

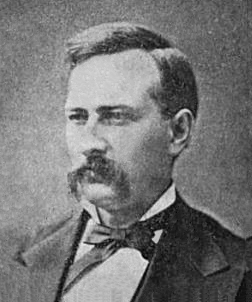
Nominee	George Hoadly	Joseph B. Foraker
Party	Democratic	Republican
Popular vote	359,693	347,164
Percentage	49.87%	48.13%
- County results Hoadly: 40–50% 50–60% 60–70% 70–80% Foraker: 40–50% 50–60% 60–70% 70–80%
Governor before election
Charles Foster
Republican
Elected Governor
George Hoadly
Democratic

The 1883 Ohio gubernatorial election was held on October 9, 1883. Democratic nominee George Hoadly defeated Republican nominee Joseph B. Foraker with 49.87% of the vote.

== General election ==
=== Candidates ===
Major party candidates

- George Hoadly, Democratic
- Joseph B. Foraker, Republican

Other candidates

- Ferdinand Schumacher, Prohibition
- Charles Jenkins, Greenback

=== Results ===
1883 Ohio gubernatorial election
Party	Candidate	Votes	%	±%
Democratic	George Hoadly	359,693	49.87%	
Republican	Joseph B. Foraker	347,164	48.13%	
Prohibition	Ferdinand Schumacher	8,362	1.16%	
Greenback	Charles Jenkins	2,937	0.41%	
Majority		12,529		
Turnout				
Democratic gain from Republican		Swing		
