= George Hoadly =

36th Governor of Ohio

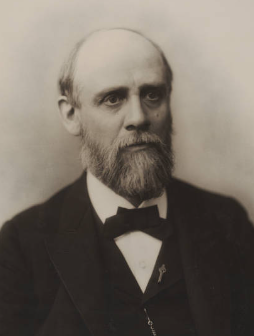

36th Governor of Ohio
- In office January 14, 1884 – January 11, 1886
- Lieutenant: John G. Warwick
- Preceded by: Charles Foster
- Succeeded by: Joseph B. Foraker

Personal details
- Born: July 31, 1826 New Haven, Connecticut, U.S.
- Died: August 26, 1902 (aged 76) Watkins Glen, New York, U.S.
- Resting place: Spring Grove Cemetery
- Party: Republican; Democratic
- Spouse: Mary Burnet Perry
- Children: 3
- Education: Western Reserve College; Harvard Law School
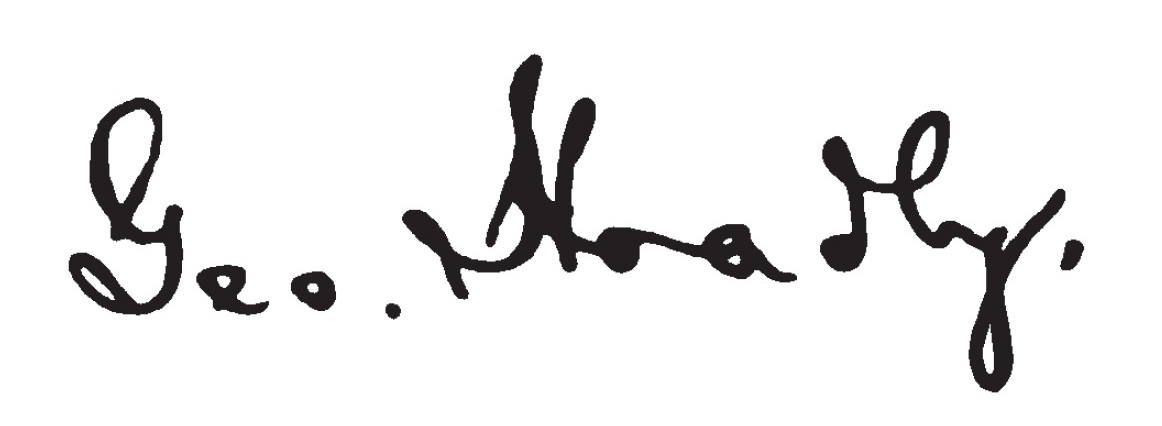
- Signature

George Hoadly (July 31, 1826 – August 26, 1902) was an American Democratic politician who served as the 36th governor of Ohio from 1884 to 1886.

== Biography ==
Hoadly was born in New Haven, Connecticut, on July 31, 1826. As the son of George Hoadley and Mary Ann Woolsey Hoadley, his birth name was "Hoadley", but he later dropped the "e".

George Hoadly graduated from Western Reserve College and attended Harvard Law School, where his fellow students included Rutherford B. Hayes and John Howell. He then studied law with Charles Converse of Zanesville, followed by study with the firm of Flamen Ball and Salmon P. Chase. Upon attaining admission to the bar Hoadly practiced in Cincinnati, initially in partnership with Ball and Chase.

Hoadly was appointed as Judge of the Cincinnati Superior Court in 1851, 1859 and 1864. From 1855 to 1859 he was City Solicitor. Hoadly also taught at the Cincinnati Law School, and served as a trustee of the University of Cincinnati. Originally a Democrat, he joined the Republicans during the American Civil War because he was opposed to slavery and supported the Union. In the mid-1870s he broke with the Republican Party and returned to the Democratic fold.

In 1883 Hoadly was the successful Democratic candidate for Governor, and he served one term, January 1884 to January 1886. During his term in office, the Cincinnati Riots of 1884 broke out over a case in which a jury gave a verdict of manslaughter rather than murder. Believing the case was an obvious murder, and upset with longstanding allegations of corruption in local government, members of the public concluded that the verdict was rigged. A riot ensued as Cincinnati residents attempted to locate and lynch the killer, and 45 to 50 people died during three days of unrest and violence before militia troops reestablished calm. Hoadly was blamed by political opponents and some observers for allowing the riot to grow by being slow to react.

In addition to the Cincinnati Riot, Hoadly used the militia to end the Great Hocking Valley Coal Strike, earning criticism from workers upset that the militia was employed, and condemnation from mine owners, who argued that Hoadly should have used the militia sooner than he did. As a result of these controversies, Hoadly was an unsuccessful candidate for reelection in 1885.

Hoadly moved to New York City in 1887, where he continued to practice law. He died in Watkins Glen on August 26, 1902, and was buried at Spring Grove Cemetery.

== Family ==
Hoadly was a descendant of George (Joris) Woolsey, one of the earliest settlers of New Amsterdam, and settler Thomas Cornell settler.

Hoadly married Mary Burnett Perry in 1851, a descendant of Dr. William Burnet, a surgeon on the staff of the Continental Army. Their son George earned degrees at Harvard University, and their son Edward M. graduated from Rensselaer Polytechnic Institute. Their daughter Laura married a second cousin, Theodore Woolsey Scarborough.

== Notes ==
Political offices
Preceded by Charles Foster	Governor of Ohio; 1884–1886	Succeeded by Joseph B. Foraker
Party political offices
Preceded by John W. Bookwalter	Democratic Party nominee for Governor of Ohio; 1883, 1885	Succeeded by Thomas E. Powell
Legal offices
Preceded by William Y. Gholson	Judge of the Superior Court of Cincinnati; 1859–1864; Served alongside: Bellamy Storer; Oliver M. Spencer (1859–1861); Charles D. Coffin (1861–1862); Stanley Matthews (1862–1863); Charles Fox (1863–1864)	Succeeded by Alphonso Taft
