= Mason Spencer =

American politician (1892–1962)

Leonard Mason Spencer

Louisiana State Representative for Madison Parish
- In office 1924–1936
- Preceded by: David M. Evans
- Succeeded by: Henry Clay Sevier

Personal details
- Born: June 11, 1892 Baton Rouge, Louisiana, United States
- Died: June 12, 1962 (aged 70)
- Cause of death: Heart attack
- Resting place: Silver Cross Cemetery in Tallulah, Louisiana
- Party: Democratic
- Spouse: Rosa Vertner Sevier Spencer (married 1917-1962, his death)
- Children: George Spencer
- Education: Law school missing
- Occupation: Lawyer Law partner of Andrew L. Sevier (wife's cousin) planter

Military service
- Branch/service: United States Army
- Battles/wars: World War I

Leonard Mason Spencer (June 11, 1892 – June 12, 1962) was a lawyer and planter from Tallulah, Louisiana, who was from 1924 to 1936 a Democratic member of the Louisiana House of Representatives for Madison Parish, located alongside the rich farming delta of the Mississippi River.

== Background ==
A native of Baton Rouge, Spencer was married in 1917 in an Episcopal ceremony to the former Rosa Vertner Sevier (1891–1978), originally from Kosciusko, Mississippi. Rosa was a great-great-granddaughter of John Sevier, a fighter in the American Revolution, an early governor of Tennessee, and the namesake of Sevierville in Sevier County in eastern Tennessee. Her cousins were Louisiana State Senator Andrew L. Sevier, whose tenure extended from 1932 until he died in office in 1962, and Henry Clay Sevier, who followed her husband in the state House seat from Madison Parish and served from 1936 to 1952.

Mason and Rosa Spencer had a child who died at birth and then a son, George Spencer (1925–1982), a World War II veteran who died in New Orleans. In 1914, Spencer's twin sister, Bessie, married Carneal Goldman, Jr., a wealthy planter in Waterproof in Tensas Parish to the south of Madison Parish. Spencer himself was a United States Army lieutenant in World War I.

== Political career ==
Spencer had been a strong critic of the administration of his fellow Democrat, Governor Huey Long He had worked with other representatives, including Cecil Morgan of Shreveport and Ralph Norman Bauer of Franklin, to secure impeachment charges against Long, which were blocked in the state senate. Long vowed to break the back of what was called the "Old Order" or sometimes the "Bourbons", the delta cotton planters, the sugar growers of South Louisiana, and the New Orleans city machine. In the wrangling over impeachment, Spencer addressed the House in a whisper, with his words "In the name of decency and common justice!", calling for a revote on adjournment which was rejected by Speaker John B. Fournet.

In April 1935, Spencer predicted that Long, by then no longer governor but a U.S. Senator, would soon die violently in the Louisiana State Capitol; in September, Long was assassinated while on business in the capitol. Specifically, Spencer had prophesied, "I can see blood on the polished floor of this Capitol" if a certain bill that he opposed was passed. Spencer was in the capitol on a Sunday night Long was shot and had been seen conversing with the senator earlier in the day. It is unclear why Long was speaking with Spencer because the two were intraparty rivals who seemed unable to reach consensus.

Spencer did not seek a third term in the state House but instead ran for governor. In his gubernatorial announcement in September 1935, some three weeks after Long's death, Spencer declared:

I am not a candidate of any machine or political organization. Consequently, I will not attempt to build up any machine nor will I permit it to be done. I will see to it that the dictatorial laws on the books are repealed and that the right of local self-government will be restored to the people. .. I pledge to restore peace and harmony to our state ...

In his gubernatorial bid, Spencer said that his supporters would all be "white Democrats", as virtually no blacks then voted in the Louisiana Democratic primaries. He also endorsed the reelection to a second term in 1936 of U.S. President Franklin D. Roosevelt though the national campaign had not yet begun at that time. At the time there was much voter sympathy in Louisiana for the pro-Long faction just a few months after Long's assassination. Spencer withdrew and endorsed the anti-Long factional candidate, Cleveland Dear of Alexandria, but victory went to the Longite choice, Richard Leche of New Orleans, with Earl Kemp Long for lieutenant governor. Spencer still polled nearly two thousand votes because his withdrawal came too late to remove his name from the ballot. Instead Spencer continued his law practice in Tallulah.

In 1932, Spencer, a sportsman armed with a hunting permit, shot a rare ivory-billed woodpecker along the Tensas River on a large tract of swamp forest land owned by the Singer Sewing Company. He killed the bird to prove to Department of Wildlife and Fisheries that the creature still existed in Madison Parish. As this particular woodpecker faced possible extinction, the Audubon Society persuaded U.S. Senator Allen J. Ellender, Huey Long's permanent successor, to work for the establishment of the proposed Tensas Swamp National Park to preserve sixty thousand acres of Singer-owned lands. Ellender's bill died in committee, and the forest was cut. Congress late established the Tensas River National Wildlife Refuge at the site.

In 1940, Spencer was an at-large delegate to the Democratic National Convention which nominated Franklin D. Roosevelt to a third term, with Henry A. Wallace for vice president. His fellow delegates included newly inaugurated Governor Sam Houston Jones, a leader of the anti-Long faction, and U.S. Representative Charles E. McKenzie of Louisiana's 5th congressional district.

The Spencers and their son are interred at Silver Cross Cemetery in Tallulah.

Preceded by David M. Evans	Louisiana State Representative for Madison Parish; 1924–1936	Succeeded by Henry Clay Sevier
