= Clyde V. Ratcliff =

American politician

Clyde Vernon Ratcliff, Sr.

Member of the Louisiana Senate
- In office 1944–1948
- Preceded by: Andrew L. Sevier
- Succeeded by: Brenham C. Crothers

Personal details
- Born: July 26, 1879 Liberty, Mississippi
- Died: October 2, 1952 (aged 73) Newellton, Tensas Parish, Louisiana
- Party: Democratic
- Spouse: Carrie Lou Muir
- Children: 4
- Education: Jefferson Military Academy
- Occupation: Cotton planter

Clyde Vernon Ratcliff, Sr. (July 26, 1879 – October 2, 1952), was an American cotton planter and politician from Newellton, Louisiana, who served as a Democrat from 1944 to 1948 in the Louisiana State Senate. He represented the delta parishes: Tensas, Madison, East Carroll, and Concordia, a rich farming region along the Mississippi River in eastern Louisiana ranging from Vidalia to Lake Providence. The four parishes elected two senators at the time, and Ratcliff's seat-mate was Andrew L. Sevier of Tallulah in Madison Parish.

== Early life and education ==
Ratcliff was born in Liberty, Mississippi and raised in Adams County. He was educated at Jefferson Military Academy in Washington near Natchez in Adams County.

== Career ==
He owned the Elkridge Plantation near Newellton in northern Tensas Parish and also engaged in the management of plantation properties of the Davis family, descendants of Jefferson Davis, the president of the Confederate States of America.

His older brother by four years, A. Bonds Ratcliff, also a graduate of Jefferson Military Academy, was a plantation manager and a deputy to Tensas Parish Sheriff John Hughes. In 1930, Bonds Ratcliff succeeded William Mackenzie Davidson as the mayor of the parish seat of St. Joseph, a position which he held until 1932. Bonds Ratcliff was thereafter the Tensas Parish clerk of court.

Prior to his single-term election to the state Senate, which corresponded with the administration of Governor Jimmie Davis, who coincidentally owned farmland in Tensas Parish, Clyde Ratcliff served on the Fifth District Levee Board and as president of the Tensas Parish Police Jury, the parish governing body. He was a charter member of Newellton Rotary International and a Methodist.

== Personal life ==
Both Clyde and Bonds Ratcliff married daughters of the wealthy planter Douglass Muir, who died in August 1918. Clyde and the former Carrie Lou Muir (1883–1958), had four children, Mrs. G. E. Thomas, Douglass Horton "Buddy" Ratcliff (1906–1984), Clyde Ratcliff, Jr. (1910–1977), and Virginia Ratcliff Wilkerson (1908–1974), the wife of James Clifton Wilkerson, I (1902–1955), and herself a 19-year member of the Tensas Parish School Board.

Ratcliff died at home; after services at Newellton Union Church, he was interred at Legion Memorial Cemetery.

Preceded by David E. Brown; Andrew L. Sevier	Louisiana State Senator for Concordia, East Carroll, Madison, and Tensas parishes Clyde Vernon Ratcliff, Sr. 1944–1948	Succeeded by Brenham C. Crothers; Andrew L. Sevier
