= Henry Clay Sevier =

American politician (1896–1974)

Henry Clay "Happy" Sevier

Louisiana State Representative from Madison Parish
- In office 1936–1952
- Preceded by: Mason Spencer
- Succeeded by: Edgar H. Lancaster, Jr.

Personal details
- Born: January 24, 1896 Madison Parish, Louisiana, U.S.
- Died: June 1, 1974 (aged 78) Vicksburg, Mississippi, U.S.
- Resting place: Silver Cross Cemetery in Tallulah
- Party: Democratic
- Spouse: Retta Brooks Sevier (married 1918-1974, his death)
- Relations: Cousins: Andrew L. Sevier; Andrew Jackson Sevier William Putnam Sevier
- Children: Carolyn Sevier Yerger Roberta Sevier Gandy Henry Clay Sevier, Jr.
- Parent(s): Roxie Roberta Allen and James Douglas Sevier, Sr.
- Education: Louisiana State University Columbia University Louisiana State University Law Center
- Occupation: Lawyer; law partner of Jefferson B. Snyder

Military service
- Branch/service: United States Army
- Battles/wars: World War I in France

Henry Clay "Happy" Sevier, Sr. (January 24, 1896 – June 1, 1974) was a lawyer and politician from Tallulah, Louisiana. One of a large political family, he served from 1936 to 1952 as a Democratic member of the Louisiana House of Representatives from Madison Parish.

== Early life and family ==
Sevier was born in 1896 in Madison Parish, Louisiana, a son of the former Roxie Roberta Allen and James Douglas Sevier, Sr., a native of Port Gibson, in Claiborne County in southwestern Mississippi. His parents moved to Madison Parish in 1880, where his father became a planter. Sevier attended local segregated schools for his lower education. He graduated in 1917 from Louisiana State University in Baton Rouge.

His father's family were descended from John Sevier, a veteran of the American Revolution, and pioneer and first governor of Tennessee. He was the namesake of Sevierville in Sevier County in eastern Tennessee. His line became prominent in northeastern Louisiana. One of Henry's cousins was Andrew L. Sevier, who served as a Louisiana State Senator with repeated reelection, from 1932 until his death in office in 1962.

During World War I, Henry Sevier served as a second lieutenant in the United States Army. He was wounded sixteen times in France, and received the Purple Heart and the Silver Star medals.

== Marriage and family ==
After the war, in 1918 Sevier married the former Retta Brooks (1899–1992) of Shreveport in northwestern Louisiana. The couple had three children: Carolyn S. Yerger (1921–1997), who married Rufus Taft Yerger, Sr. (1914–1973); Roberta Sevier Gandy (1924–2006), who married Robert Wyly Gandy, Jr. (1915–1987), and Henry Clay Sevier, Jr. (1925–2016), who became an attorney and a partner in his father's law firm for a time and served on the Board of Governors of the Louisiana State Bar Association. He later moved to Covington in St. Tammany Parish.

== Graduate school and career ==
Sevier and his wife went to New York City, where he completed postgraduate work at Columbia University in 1921. He graduated from the Louisiana State University Law Center, and they settled in Tallulah.

There Sevier entered into practice with Jefferson B. Snyder of Tallulah, the political boss of the delta parishes in northeastern Louisiana. Snyder wielded power for more than 40 years as the regional district attorney, from 1904 to 1948.

Sevier decided to enter politics. A member of the Democratic Party, in 1936 Sevier was elected to the Louisiana House from Madison Parish to succeed fellow Democrat, Mason Spencer of Tallulah. Spencer was the husband of his Sevier cousin, Rosa Vertner Sevier Spencer (1891-1978).

Sevier was elected a few months after the assassination of Governor Huey Pierce Long, Jr. At the time, there was much voter sympathy for the pro-Long faction. The staunchly anti-Long Mason Spencer had earlier announced that he would run for governor, but he withdrew before the election. Richard Leche of New Orleans, the choice of the Long faction, won the election uncontested.

After his law partner Snyder died in 1951, Sevier formed the Sevier, Yerger, and Sevier law firm in Tallulah. (His son Henry became an attorney and his partner in the firm for a period of time.) The senior Sevier was also president of the Tallulah State Bank and Trust Company. Given these additional responsibilities, and having served eight terms in the state house, he chose not to run again after his term ending in 1952.

Like Snyder, Sevier was active in the Democratic State Central Committee. He was the national committeeman during the first administration of Governor Jimmie Davis. Afterward he was selected as the state Democratic Party chairman under Governor Earl Kemp Long.

He belonged to the Presbyterian church with his wife. He was affiliated with the 6th Judicial District Bar Association, Rotary International, and the Masonic lodge.

Sevier died in 1974 in Mercy Hospital in Vicksburg, Mississippi. Along with many Sevier family members, Sevier and his wife are interred at Silver Cross Cemetery in Tallulah.

Preceded by Mason Spencer	Louisiana State Representative from Madison Parish; 1936-1952	Succeeded by Edgar H. Lancaster Jr.
