= Brenham C. Crothers =

American politician

Brenham Calhoun Crothers

Louisiana State Senator from Tensas, Concordia, East Carroll, and Madison parishes
- In office 1948–1952
- Preceded by: Clyde V. Ratcliff; Andrew L. Sevier
- Succeeded by: W. E. Person; Andrew L. Sevier
- In office 1956–1960
- Preceded by: W. E. Person
- Succeeded by: Howard M. Jones; Andrew L. Sevier

Personal details
- Born: January 2, 1905 Ouachita Parish, Louisiana, US
- Died: April 27, 1984 (aged 79)
- Resting place: Calhoun Cemetery in Calhoun, Louisiana
- Party: Democratic
- Spouse: Berta Hammett Crothers
- Occupation: Cattleman

Brenham Calhoun Crothers (January 2, 1905 – April 27, 1984) was a Democratic member of the Louisiana State Senate from Ferriday in Concordia Parish in eastern Louisiana, who served two nonconsecutive terms from 1948 to 1952 and 1956 to 1960, both corresponding with the administrations of Governor Earl Kemp Long.

== Career ==
In addition to Concordia Parish, Crothers' senatorial district included the Mississippi River delta parishes of East Carroll, Madison, and Tensas. In both terms his district colleague was Andrew L. Sevier of Tallulah, a senator from 1932 until his death in office in 1962. Voters from the four parishes at the time elected two senators. That system changed by 1972, with implementation of the United States Supreme Court decision, Reynolds v. Sims, which mandates one man, one vote in state legislative districting.

Crothers served as president of the Louisiana Cattleman's Association and as a second vice-president of the American National Cattleman's Association. In 1967, long after he had left the state Senate, Crothers lobbied U.S. Senator Russell B. Long of Louisiana, the chairman of the Senate Finance Committee, in support of import restrictions on beef. In his statement before Long's committee, Crothers noted that Louisiana in 1966 had 45,000 herds of cattle and that beef was the number one agricultural product in the state. He questioned how domestic beef producers, with high costs, wages, and taxes, could be expected to compete with foreign imports of cattle grown with a cheap, inferior feed. Crothers also noted that the beef industry is the largest user of subsidized feed grain, but he warned that "the cattle industry is becoming a sick industry."

The Brenham C. Crothers Scholarship is awarded in his honor by the animal science division at Louisiana State University in Baton Rouge.

== Extended family ==
Crothers was born in Calhoun near West Monroe in west Ouachita Parish to Albert Brenham Crothers and the former Rill D Calhoun.

Crothers was married to the former Berta Hammett, daughter of Berta Wells Hammett and Albert Galloway Hammett, Sr., a native of Campti in Natchitoches Parish, who was from 1933 to 1964 the tax assessor of Caddo Parish. She was a much older step-sister of her father's successor as tax assessor, Charles Russell Henington, Sr. Henington was among six parish officials killed in a plane crash in Shreveport on May 8, 1986; he was piloting his plane and carrying five of his assistants for a meeting in Baton Rouge. The tragedy attracted national attention.

| Preceded by Andrew L. Sevier; Clyde V. Ratcliff | Louisiana State Senator from Concordia, East Carroll, Madison, and Tensas parishes Brenham Calhoun Crothers; 1948–1952 | Succeeded by W. E. Person; Andrew L. Sevier |
| Preceded by Andrew L. Sevier; W. E. Person | Louisiana State Senator from Concordia, East Carroll, Madison, and Tensas parishes Brenham Calhoun Crothers; 1956–1960 | Succeeded by Howard M. Jones; Andrew L. Sevier |
