= Tensas River National Wildlife Refuge =

Protected wildlife area in northeastern Louisiana

- IUCN category IV (habitat/species management area)
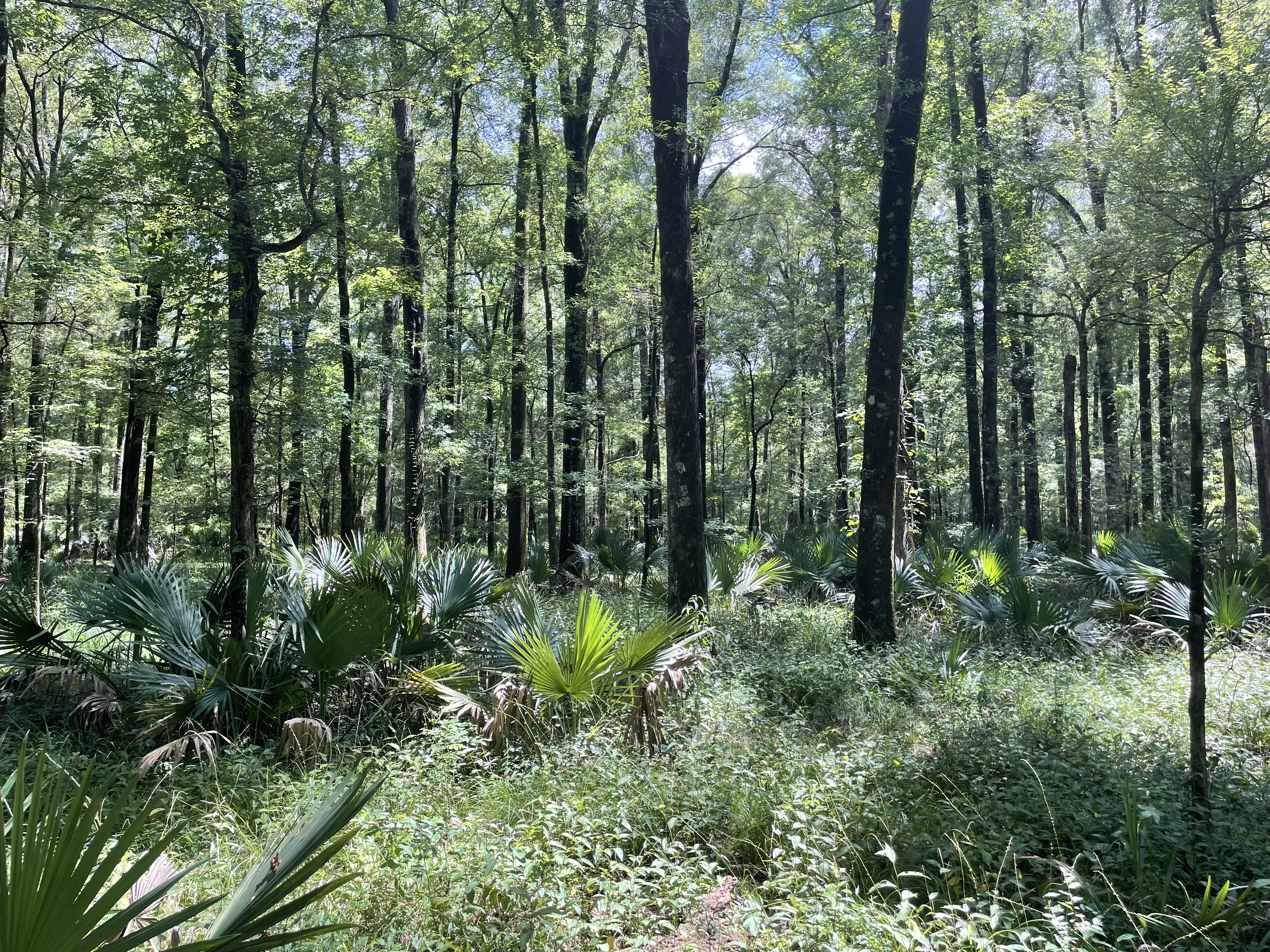
- Tensas River National Wildlife Refuge on July 20, 2025

- Location within Louisiana Location within the United States
- Location: Madison / Tensas / Franklin parishes, Louisiana
- Nearest city: Tallulah, Louisiana
- Coordinates: 32°15′N 91°22′W
- Area: 64,012 acres (259.05 km^{2})
- Established: 1980
- Visitors: 72,000 (in 2005)
- Governing body: U.S. Fish and Wildlife Service
- Website: Tensas River National Wildlife Refuge

Tensas River National Wildlife Refuge

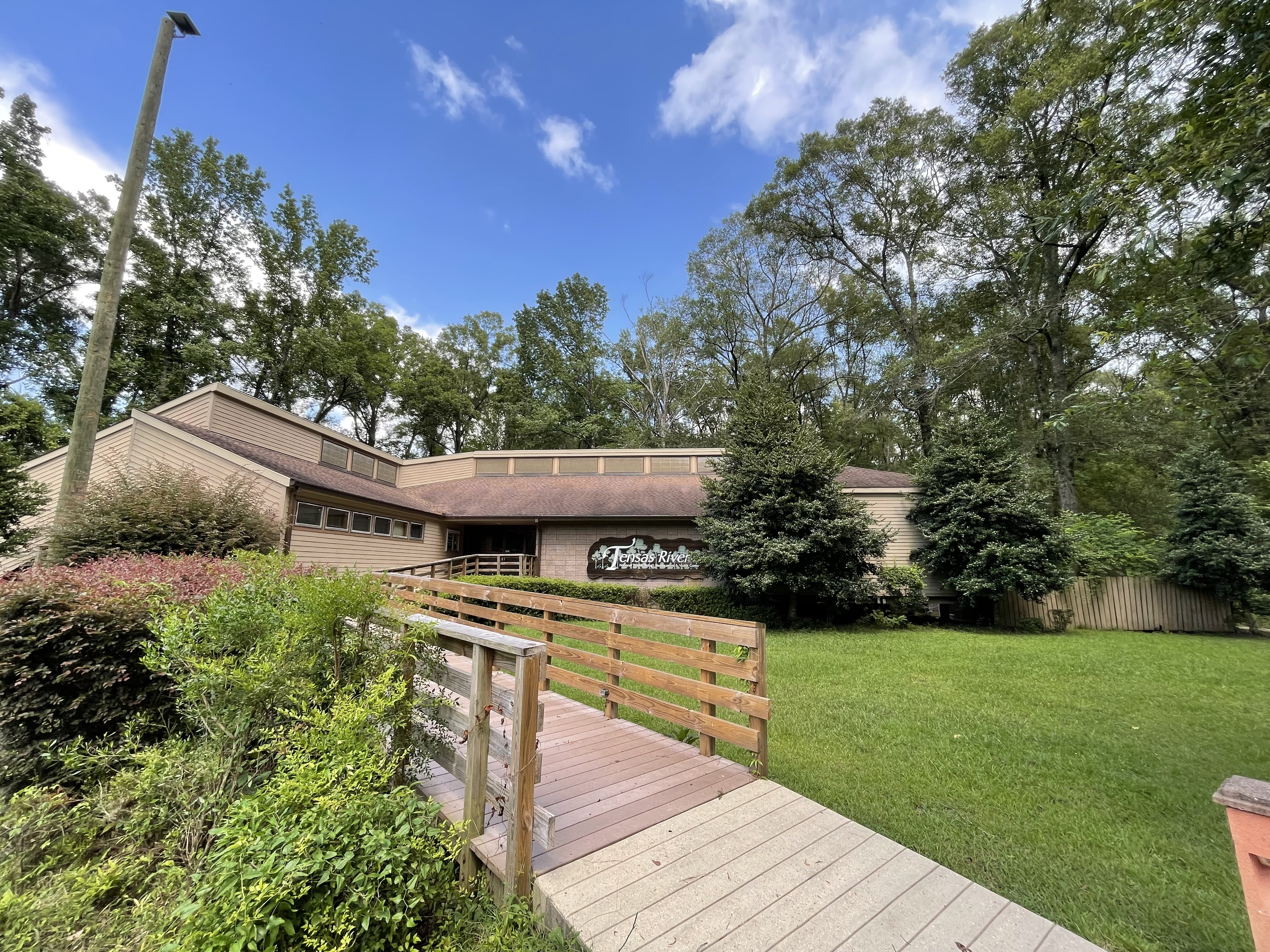
Tensas River National Wildlife Refuge visitor center.

North American river otter (Lontra canadensis) in Tensas River National Wildlife Refuge

The Tensas River National Wildlife Refuge is a protected wildlife area located west of the city of Tallulah in Madison, Tensas and Franklin parishes in northeastern Louisiana, USA.

== Wildlife and habitat ==
The refuge is in located in the upper basin of the Tensas River, which is also the last documented home of the ivory-billed woodpecker. The refuge also has one of the last concentrations of the threatened Louisiana black bear. In 1907, former President Teddy Roosevelt hunted black bear just north of the refuge boundary and the famous "teddy bear" was introduced as a result of an incident during the hunt. Concentrations of ducks, geese, raptors, wading birds and shorebirds are present. Several rookeries are in the reserve.

In 1932, Mason Spencer, a state representative from the nearby town of Tallulah, armed with a gun and a hunting permit, shot a rare male ivory-billed woodpecker on a large tract of swamp forest land owned by the Singer Sewing Company. He killed the bird to prove to the Department of Wildlife and Fisheries that the creature existed in Madison Parish, as that had been a matter in dispute. As this particular woodpecker faced ultimate extinction, as early as 1938, the Audubon Society persuaded U.S. Senator Allen J. Ellender to work for the establishment of a proposed Tensas Swamp National Park to preserve sixty thousand acres of lands then owned by the Singer Company. Ellender's bill died in committee, but in 1980, Congress established the Tensas River National Wildlife Refuge.

== See also ==
- List of National Wildlife Refuges: Louisiana
