= Tensas Parish, Louisiana =

Parish in Louisiana, United States

Tensas Parish
- Parish
- Parish of Tensas; Paroisse des Tensas (French)
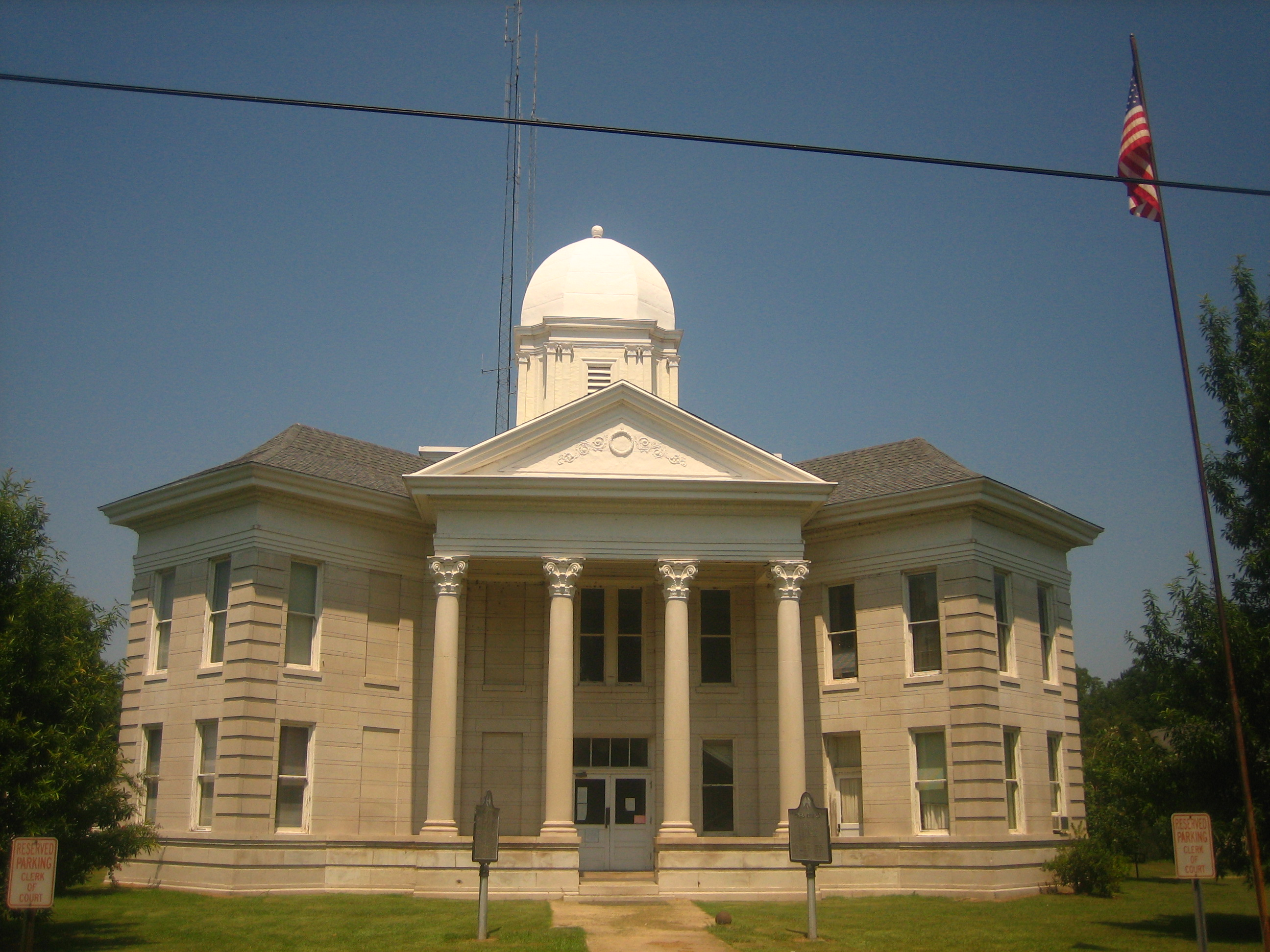
- Tensas Parish Courthouse at St. Joseph

- Seal

- Location within the U.S. state of Louisiana
- Coordinates: 32°00′N 91°20′W
- Country: United States
- State: Louisiana
- Founded: March 17, 1843
- Named for: Taensa people
- Seat: St. Joseph
- Largest town: Newellton

Area
  - Total: 641 sq mi (1,660 km^{2})
  - Land: 603 sq mi (1,560 km^{2})
  - Water: 38 sq mi (98 km^{2}) 6.0%

Population (2020)
  - Total: 4,147
  - Estimate (2025): 3,700 ▼
  - Density: 6.88/sq mi (2.66/km^{2})
- Time zone: UTC−6 (Central)
  - Summer (DST): UTC−5 (CDT)
- Congressional district: 5th
- Website: louisiana.gov/Government/Parish_Tensas/

Tensas Parish (French: Paroisse des Tensas) is a parish located in the northeastern section of the State of Louisiana; its eastern border is the Mississippi River. As of the 2020 census, the population was 4,147. It is the least populated parish in Louisiana. The parish seat is St. Joseph. The name Tensas is derived from the historic indigenous Taensa people. The parish was founded in 1843 following Indian Removal.

The parish was developed for cotton agriculture, which dominated the economy through the early 20th century. There has also been some cattle ranching in the 1930s and timber extraction.

== History ==
=== Pre-history ===
Tensas Parish was the home to many successive indigenous groups in the thousands of years before European settlements began. Some village and mound sites once built by these various peoples are preserved today as archaeological sites.

One example is the Flowery Mound, a rectangular platform mound just east of St. Joseph. It measures 10 feet (3.0 m) in height and 165 by 130 feet (50 by 40 m) at its base; the summit measures 50 feet (15 m) square. Core samples taken during investigations at the site have revealed the mound was built in a single stage. Because the fill types can still be differentiated, the mound is thought to be relatively young. Radiocarbon dating of charcoal found in a midden under the mound reveals that the site was occupied from 996 to 1162 during the Coles Creek period. The mound was built over the midden between 1200 and 1541 during the Plaquemine/Mississippian culture period. The corners of the mound are oriented in the four cardinal directions. Related ancient sites include Balmoral Mounds, Ghost Site Mounds, and Sundown Mounds.

Historic tribes in this area were the Choctaw and Natchez, in addition to smaller groups such as the Taensa people.

=== Antebellum development ===
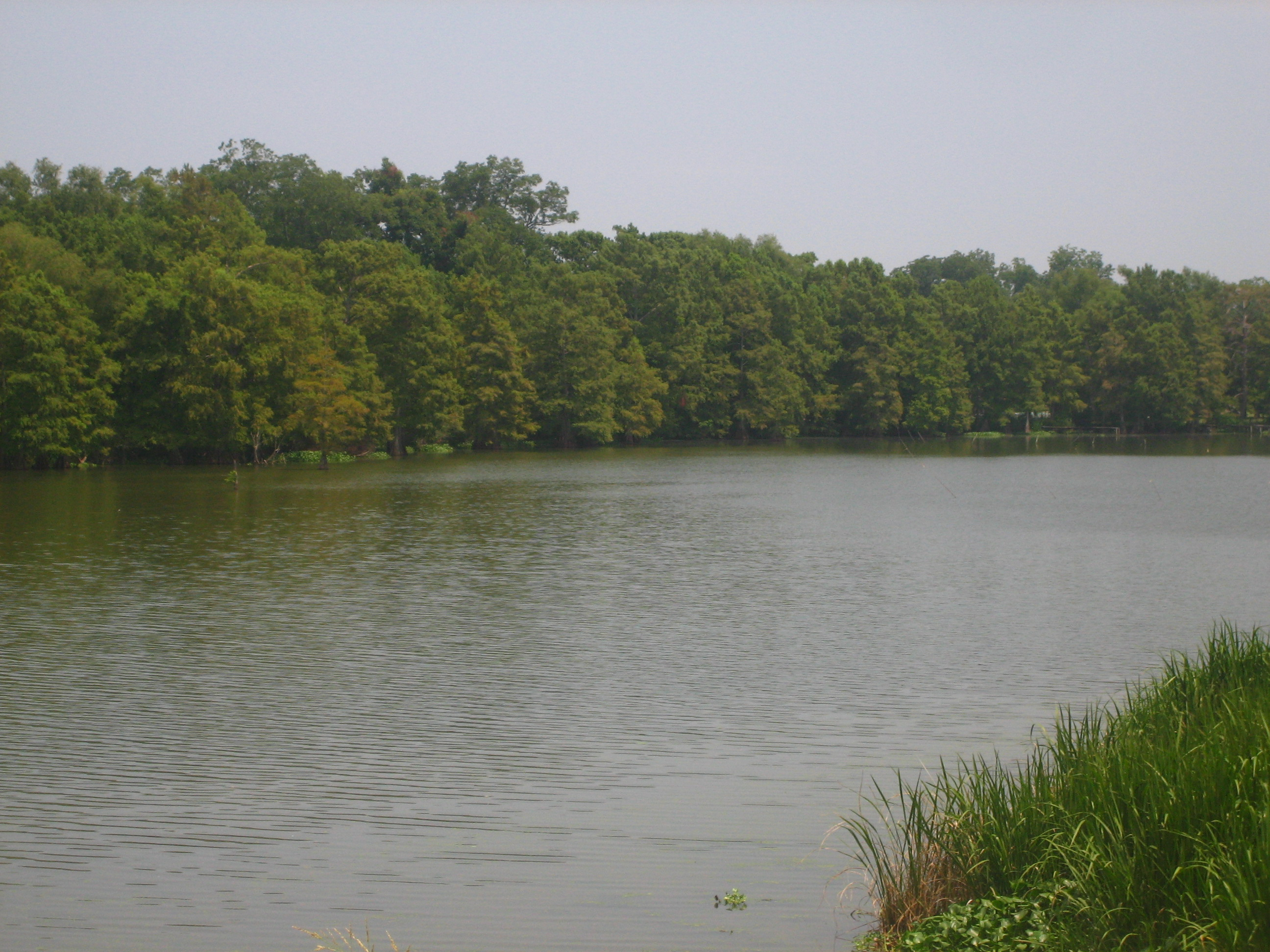
Lake St. Joseph, an ox-bow lake of the Mississippi River at Newellton

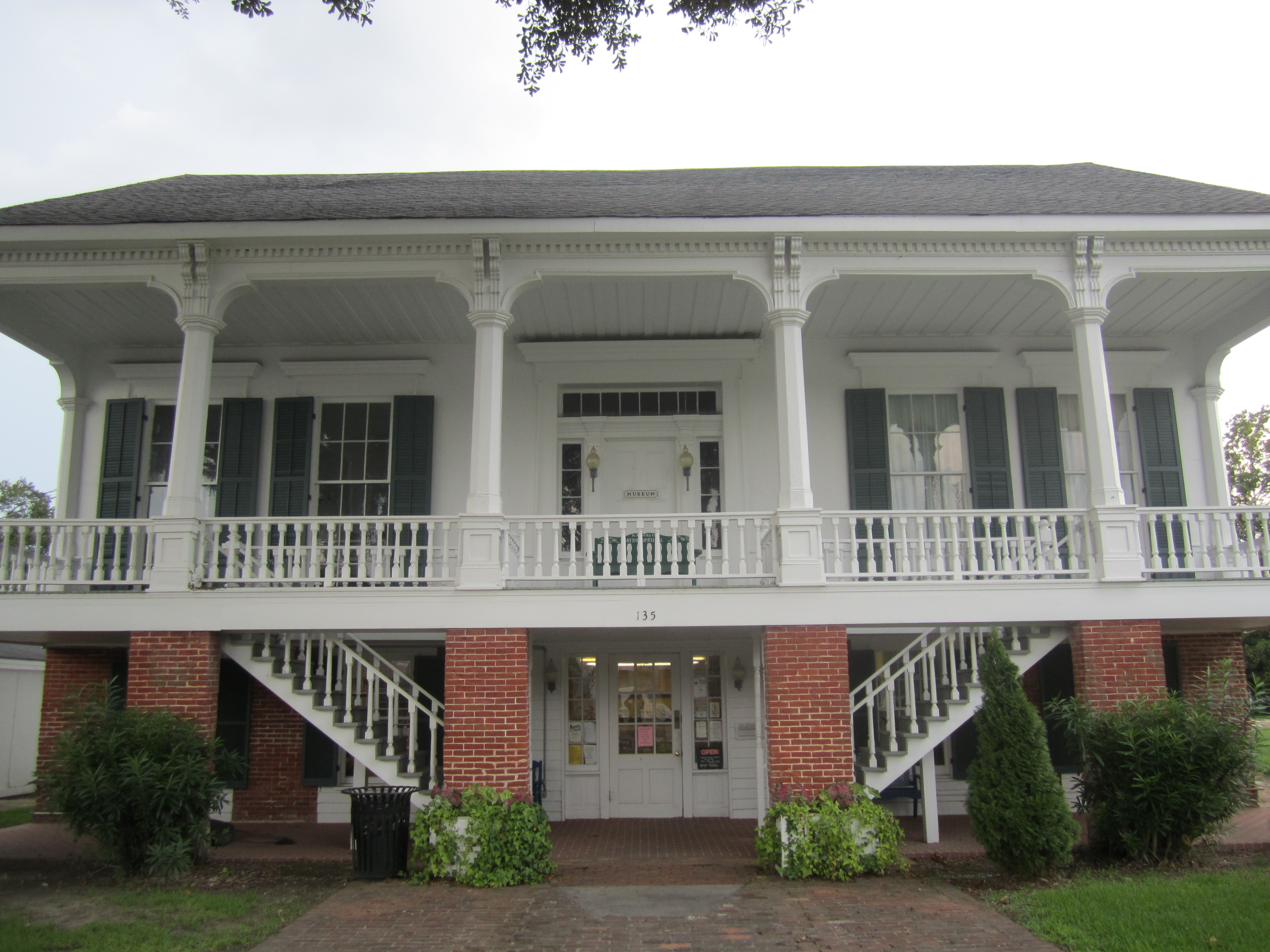
Tensas Parish Library

Following Indian Removal by the United States government in the 1830s, the land was sold and this area was developed by European Americans for cotton plantations, the leading commodity crop before the Civil War. Planters moved into the area from the eastern and upper South, either bringing or purchasing numerous enslaved Africans as workers. They developed plantations along the river and Lake St. Joseph, as waterways were required for transportation routes and access to markets. In 1861, according to the United States Coast Survey map, 90.8% of the parish's inhabitants were slaves.

=== Reconstruction ===
During and after the Reconstruction era, white Democrats acted to suppress black and Republican voting in the state and in this parish with its large black majority. They enforced Jim Crow laws and rules through intimidation and violence, including lynchings.

From 1877 to 1950, there were 30 lynchings of Black people in Tensas Parish, most in the decades around the turn of the 20th century; Tensas was among the four parishes in Louisiana with the highest number of lynchings in this period, and Louisiana was among the states with the highest number of such murders.

But from 1878 through 1920, the Mississippi Delta area of northern Louisiana legally executed more blacks than did any other part of the state, after they had been convicted by all-white juries. For instance, between 1880 and 1920, twelve persons were executed in Tensas Parish, at least seven of them black.

=== 20th century to present ===
By the turn of the 20th century, the parish seat of St. Joseph had 720 residents. Tensas Parish had 19,070. Most of the population was still engaged in cotton agriculture, where numerous African Americans worked as sharecroppers and tenant farmers. Others worked in trades associated with river traffic.

While mechanization was gradually introduced, blacks left Tensas Parish before its full effects had taken place, to escape the violence of lynchings and executions. In the 1900 census Tensas Parish had 17,839 African Americans (94 percent) and 1,231 whites (6 percent). By 1920, the number of African Americans had declined by 42% to 10,314 (making up 85 percent of the parish population). Whites numbered 1,771 (15 percent).

Twenty years later, by 1940, the number of blacks in the parish had risen only to 11,194 (70 percent) while the whites had increased markedly to 4,746 (30 percent). These differences likely reflected a continuing outmigration by blacks, as well as in-migration of whites from other areas, who settled in the hill country during the 1920s–1930s. Both blacks and whites left the parish to move to defense industry jobs on the United States West Coast during and after World War II.

In 1962, when only whites could vote, Tensas Parish gave Republican Taylor W. O'Hearn 48.2 percent of the vote in a race for the U.S. Senate against powerful incumbent Democrat Russell B. Long. Long overwhelmingly defeated O'Hearn statewide.

Prior to January 1964, when fifteen African Americans were permitted to register, there had been no black voters on the Tensas Parish rolls since the state passed a constitution in 1898 to disenfranchise blacks. In 1964 the parish consisted of 7,000 blacks and 4,000 whites. Whites had controlled the political system since the late 19th century and excluded blacks from the political system for more than 60 years. Tensas was the last of Louisiana's parishes in the 20th century to allow African Americans to register to vote.

In the fall of 1964 O'Hearn was elected to an at-large seat from Caddo Parish as a state representative from Shreveport. Another white Republican was also elected from Caddo Parish, as were three Democrats, all running for at-large seats. In 1964 Tensas Parish, with mostly only conservative whites voting, supported Republican presidential nominee Barry M. Goldwater rather than incumbent Democratic President Lyndon B. Johnson, who was supporting civil rights. Few of the parish's thousands of black residents were yet enabled to vote.

After the passage of the Voting Rights Act of 1965, large numbers of Tensas Parish blacks began registering to vote. These new black voters were staunchly Democratic, as the national party had supported their drive for civil rights. Since then, the black majority of the parish has made it a Democratic stronghold. Some white Democrats have been elected to public offices in the parish, including Sheriff Rickey A. Jones and several school board members.

In November 2019, Alex "Chip" Watson Jr., who is African American, was elected to the District 1 police jury seat. Watson defeated incumbent Larry W. Foster, who is white and the police jury president, and challenger "Johnny" Daves, who is also white. With Watson's victory, the Tensas Parish Police Jury will be majority African American for the first time in the parish's history.

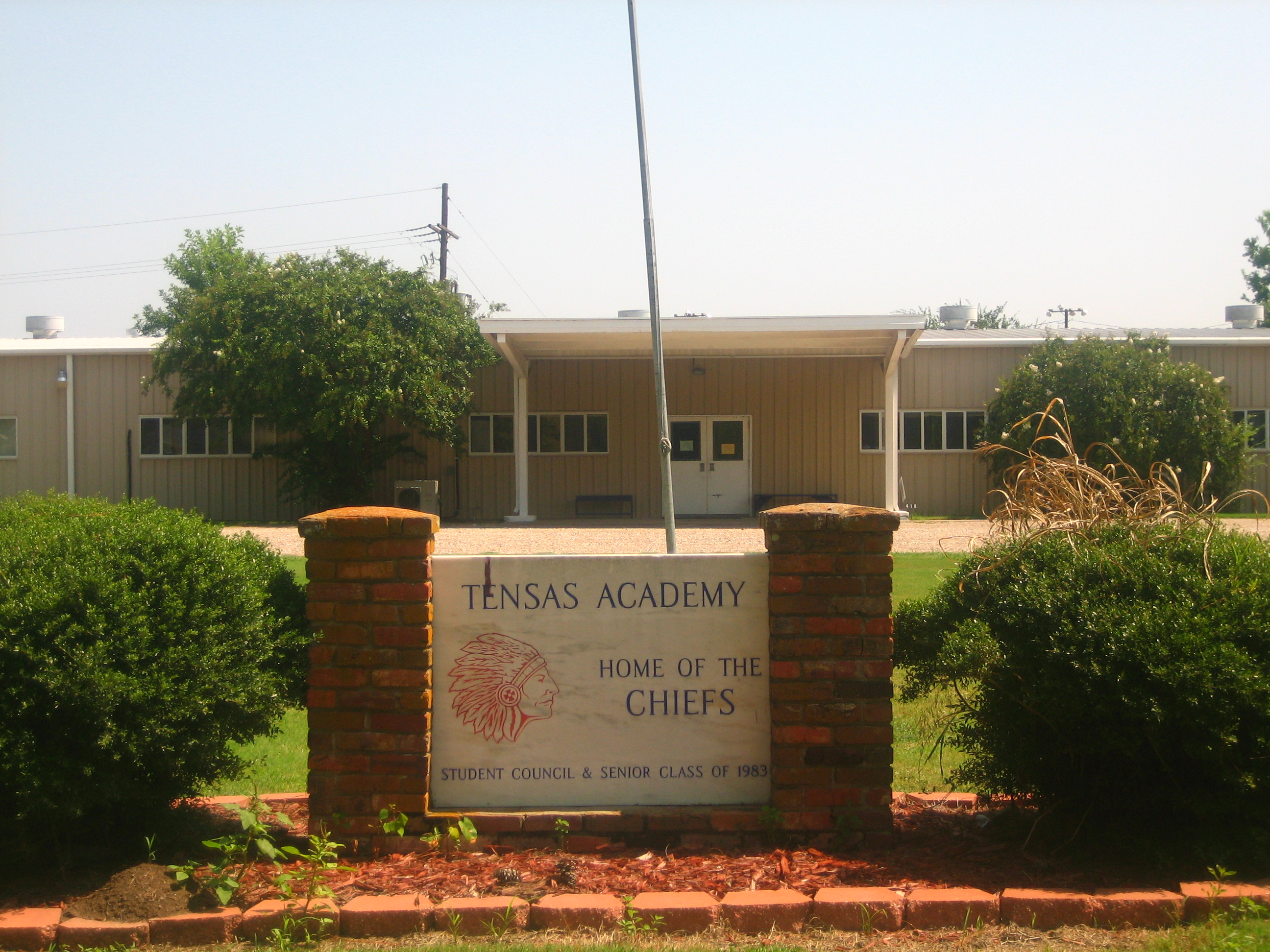
Tensas Academy in St. Joseph opened in 1970.

Tensas Parish was de jure desegregated until the fall of 1970. Although the state officially desegregated, the schools are largely de facto segregated, as many white parents have sent their children to private academies founded at that time. The majority of white students attend the private Tensas Academy in St. Joseph. Nearly all African-American pupils attend the public schools, where few whites are registered.

Enrollment in the public system, now based in St. Joseph, has declined in recent years as parish population has declined. The former Newellton High School in Newellton and Waterproof High School and Lisbon Elementary School in Waterproof have closed because of decreased enrollments. Tensas High School in St. Joseph was consolidated in 2006 from the former Joseph Moore Davidson High School of St. Joseph, as well as Newellton and Waterproof high schools.

In May 2010, the graduating class of forty students at Tensas High School included three whites. Ten white students graduated from Tensas Academy, and four whites from the private Newellton Christian Academy.

==== Partisan politics ====
Historically, Tensas Parish has been heavily Democratic in orientation, although the make-up of the party has changed markedly in terms of demographics.

In the 1860 presidential election, the parish supported by plurality the Constitutional Union Party candidate, U.S. Senator John Bell of Tennessee, who pledged to support the Constitution of the United States, the Union of states, and the "enforcement of the laws." Louisiana as a whole narrowly cast its electoral votes for the Southern Democratic choice, Vice President John C. Breckinridge of Kentucky. Regular Democratic nominee Stephen A. Douglas of Illinois ran poorly in Louisiana, and the Republican candidate, Abraham Lincoln, also of Illinois, was not even listed on the state ballot.

The end of the war was followed by emancipation of millions of enslaved African Americans in the South. After gaining the franchise, most black men joined the Republican Party, electing candidates who made up a biracial legislature in Louisiana during Reconstruction. White Democratic groups worked through intimidation and fraud to suppress black and white Republican voting during and after the Reconstruction era. In 1898 Louisiana passed a new state constitution with provisions that created barriers to voter registration in order to disenfranchise African-American voters and cripple the Republican Party. Louisiana was effectively a one-party state and part of the Solid South for the next several decades.

In 1988, Vice President George H. W. Bush, the Republican presidential nominee, prevailed in Tensas Parish with 1,645 votes (50 percent). Governor Michael Dukakis of Massachusetts trailed with 1,556 (47.3 percent).

In 1996, native son of the South U.S. President Bill Clinton obtained 1,882 votes (60.7 percent) in Tensas Parish, and the Republican Bob Dole of Kansas polled 1,000 votes (32.3 percent).

In 2000, the Democratic nominee, Vice President Al Gore, won Tensas Parish by 250 votes. The Democratic electors polled 1,580 votes that year to 1,330 for the George W. Bush-Dick Cheney ticket. In 2004, the Democratic ticket of U.S. Senators John F. Kerry of Massachusetts and John Edwards of North Carolina carried Tensas Parish, 1,460 (49.6 percent) to 1,453 (49 percent) for Bush-Cheney.

In the 2008 presidential contest, Democratic nominee Barack Obama of Illinois won Tensas Parish, 1,646 (54.1 percent) to 1,367 (45 percent) for Republican Senator John McCain of Arizona. In 2012, President Obama again carried the parish, with 1,564 votes (55.6 percent), while rival Mitt Romney polled 1,230 votes (43.7 percent). The Obama-McCain and Obama-Romney voter divisions in 2008 and 2012 reflect the demographics of the political parties in Tensas Parish.

In the 2004 U.S. Senate primary election, Tensas Parish gave a plurality to the Republican candidate, U.S. Representative David Vitter of St. Tammany Parish, who polled 1,145 votes (41 percent) compared to 881 ballots (32 percent) for his chief Democratic rival, Congressman Chris John of Crowley. He won statewide. There was no general election in Tensas Parish to determine if Vitter would have surpassed 50 percent plus one vote to obtain an outright majority in this traditionally Democratic parish.

In 2007, the successful Republican gubernatorial candidate, U.S. Representative Bobby Jindal, polled 40 percent in Tensas Parish. Tensas gave a plurality of 48 percent to Secretary of State Democrat Jay Dardenne. Two Republican candidates ran for a seat on the Tensas Parish Police Jury, the parish governing body, and Emmett L. Adams Jr., won over fellow Republican Patrick Glass, 207-179 votes (54–46 percent).

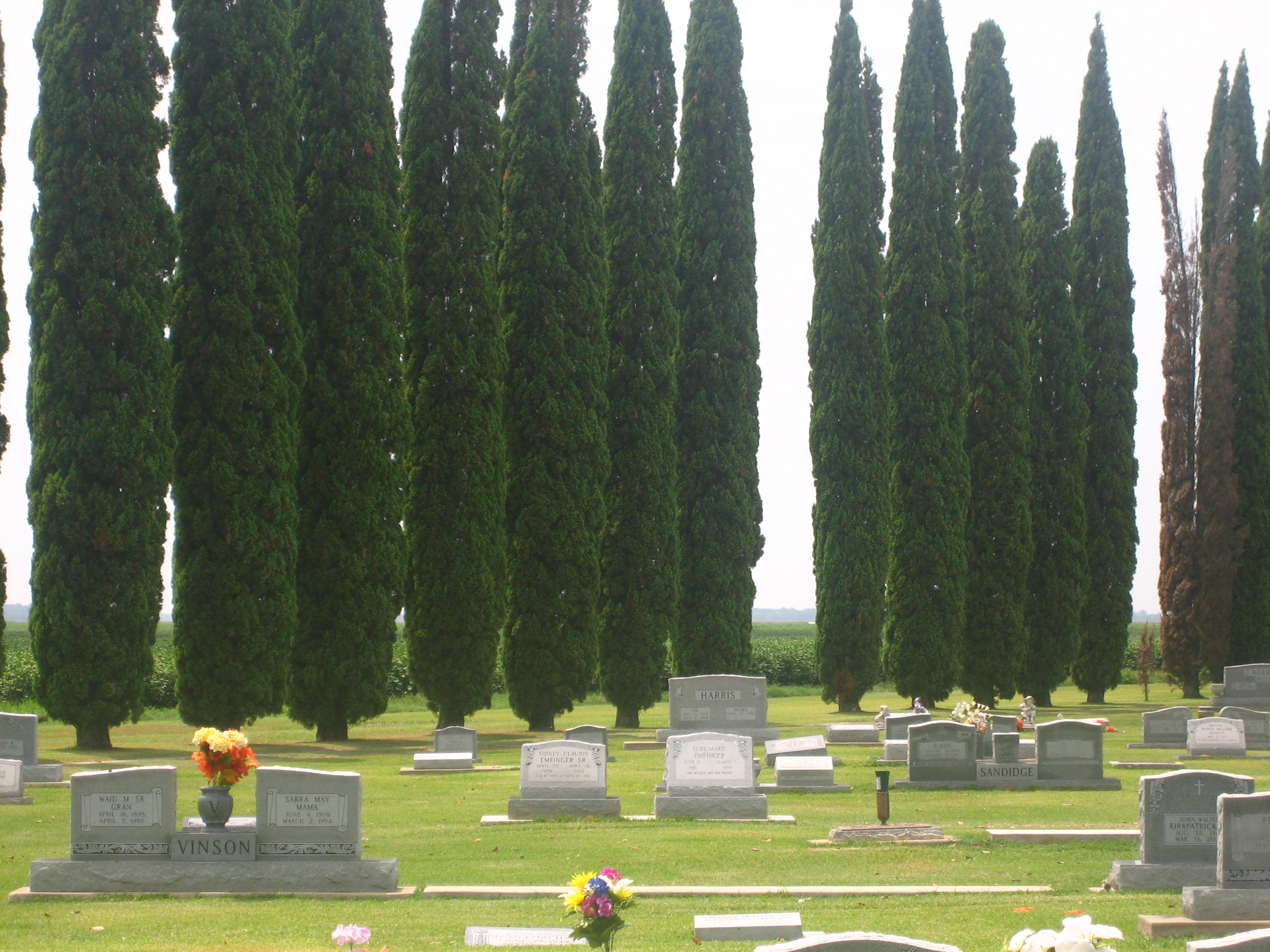
Legion Memorial Cemetery is located north of Newellton off Louisiana Highway 605.

Under the state constitution, prior to 1968, each parish -regardless of population- elected at least one member to the Louisiana House of Representatives. That year the US Supreme Court ruled that states had to develop legislative districts that were based on roughly equal populations and had to be redistricted after each decennial census, based on the principle of "one man, one vote". It said there was no constitutional basis for state legislatures to be based on geographical districts (such as one representative per parish), as that system had resulted in inequities: particularly marked under-representation of more populated, urbanized areas and an unequal dominance of state legislatures by rural areas. Louisiana and numerous other states had not regularly conducted redistricting, although there had been dramatic population shifts since the turn of the 20th century.

The last member to represent only Tensas Parish was Democrat S. S. DeWitt of Newellton and later St. Joseph. DeWitt won the legislative post in 1964 by unseating 20-year incumbent J.C. Seaman of Waterproof. Because of Tensas Parish's small population, the state house district was made to include part of Franklin Parish. In the 1971 primary, DeWitt lost the seat to Lantz Womack of Winnsboro in Franklin Parish.

== Geography ==
According to the U.S. Census Bureau, the parish has a total area of 641 square miles (1,660 km^{2}), of which 603 square miles (1,560 km^{2}) is land and 38 square miles (98 km^{2}) (6.0%) is water.

The parish seat of St. Joseph is located adjacent to the Mississippi River levee system, which protects the eastern border of the parish along the river.

The developed Lake Bruin State Park lies near St. Joseph. Lake Bruin is an oxbow lake created by the meandering of the Mississippi River; there are two other oxbow lakes in the parish.

=== Adjacent parishes and counties ===
- Madison Parish (north)
- Warren County, Mississippi (northeast)
- Claiborne County, Mississippi (east)
- Jefferson County, Mississippi (east)
- Adams County, Mississippi (southeast)
- Concordia Parish (south)
- Catahoula Parish (southwest)
- Franklin Parish (west)

== Communities ==
The largely rural parish has three communities: Newellton, St. Joseph, and Waterproof. Newellton was founded by the planter and attorney John David Stokes Newell Sr., who named it for his father Edward D. Newell, a native of North Carolina. Tensas Parish has one principal cemetery, Legion Memorial, established in 1943 and located just north of Newellton. A new entrance sign to the cemetery has been erected.

All three communities are linked by U.S. Highway 65, which passes just to the west of each town.

=== Major highways ===
- U.S. Highway 65
- Louisiana Highway 4
- Louisiana Highway 128
- Louisiana Highway 566
- Louisiana Highway 568
- Louisiana Highway 569
- Louisiana Highway 570
- Louisiana Highway 571
- Louisiana Highway 573
- Louisiana Highway 575
- Louisiana Highway 603
- Louisiana Highway 604
- Louisiana Highway 605
- Louisiana Highway 606
- Louisiana Highway 607
- Louisiana Highway 608
- Louisiana Highway 887
- Louisiana Highway 888
- Louisiana Highway 892
- Louisiana Highway 896
- Louisiana Highway 897-1
- Louisiana Highway 897-2
- Louisiana Highway 897-3
- Louisiana Highway 897-4
- Louisiana Highway 897-5
- Louisiana Highway 897-6
- Louisiana Highway 898
- Louisiana Highway 1079
- Louisiana Highway 3009
- Louisiana Highway 3024
- Louisiana Highway 3044
- Louisiana Highway 3078
- Louisiana Highway 3209
- Louisiana Highway 3252

=== National protected area ===
- Tensas River National Wildlife Refuge (part)

=== Towns ===
- Newellton
- St. Joseph (parish seat)

=== Village ===
- Waterproof

=== Unincorporated communities ===
- Balmoral
- Crimea
- Helena
- Mayflower
- Somerset
- Yucatan Landing

==== Ghost town ====
- New Carthage

== Demographics ==
The mostly rural parish has continued to lose population. Between July 1, 2006, and July 1, 2007, Tensas Parish lost 173 residents, or 2.9 percent of its population. Police Jury Vice President Jane Merriett Netterville, a Democrat from St. Joseph, expressed surprise at those figures, as a number of people had moved into the parish in 2005 and 2006 as refugees from New Orleans and coastal areas after Hurricane Katrina. "Maybe the loss was the people who died. We have a large elderly population," she told the Baton Rouge Morning Advocate. Netterville explained that younger people leave Tensas Parish because of the scarcity of higher-paying jobs.

Historical population
Census	Pop.	Note	%±
1850	9,040		—
1860	16,078		77.9%
1870	12,419		−22.8%
1880	17,815		43.4%
1890	16,647		−6.6%
1900	19,070		14.6%
1910	17,060		−10.5%
1920	12,085		−29.2%
1930	15,096		24.9%
1940	15,940		5.6%
1950	13,209		−17.1%
1960	11,796		−10.7%
1970	9,732		−17.5%
1980	8,525		−12.4%
1990	7,103		−16.7%
2000	6,618		−6.8%
2010	5,252		−20.6%
2020	4,147		−21.0%
2025 (est.)	3,700	▼	−10.8%
U.S. Decennial Census; 1790–1960 1900–1990; 1990–2000 2010

=== 2020 census ===
As of the 2020 census, Tensas Parish had 4,147 people, 1,766 households, and 1,102 families. The median age was 47.6 years. 22.0% of residents were under the age of 18 and 24.6% of residents were 65 years of age or older. For every 100 females there were 91.5 males, and for every 100 females age 18 and over there were 87.1 males age 18 and over.

There were 2,779 housing units, of which 36.5% were vacant. Among occupied housing units, 71.5% were owner-occupied and 28.5% were renter-occupied. The homeowner vacancy rate was 2.4% and the rental vacancy rate was 8.7%.

The racial makeup of the parish was 42.1% White, 54.3% Black or African American, <0.1% American Indian and Alaska Native, 0.1% Asian, <0.1% Native Hawaiian and Pacific Islander, 0.5% from some other race, and 3.1% from two or more races. Hispanic or Latino residents of any race comprised 1.6% of the population.

<0.1% of residents lived in urban areas, while 100.0% lived in rural areas.

Out of Louisiana's 64 parishes, it is one of six that have an African-American majority population (2020).

=== Racial and ethnic composition ===
Tensas Parish, Louisiana – Racial and ethnic composition Note: the US Census treats Hispanic/Latino as an ethnic category. This table excludes Latinos from the racial categories and assigns them to a separate category. Hispanics/Latinos may be of any race.
Race / Ethnicity (NH = Non-Hispanic)	Pop 1980	Pop 1990	Pop 2000	Pop 2010	Pop 2020	% 1980	% 1990	% 2000	% 2010	% 2020
White alone (NH)	3,828	3,279	2,842	2,178	1,728	44.90%	46.16%	42.94%	41.47%	41.67%
Black or African American alone (NH)	4,605	3,763	3,642	2,957	2,232	54.02%	52.98%	55.03%	56.30%	53.82%
Native American or Alaska Native alone (NH)	0	12	3	6	0	0.00%	0.17%	0.05%	0.11%	0.00%
Asian alone (NH)	8	2	7	8	6	0.09%	0.03%	0.11%	0.15%	0.14%
Native Hawaiian or Pacific Islander alone (NH)	x	x	0	0	1	x	x	0.00%	0.00%	0.02%
Other race alone (NH)	1	4	0	0	11	0.01%	0.06%	0.00%	0.00%	0.27%
Mixed race or Multiracial (NH)	x	x	41	38	102	x	x	0.62%	0.72%	2.46%
Hispanic or Latino (any race)	83	43	83	65	67	0.97%	0.61%	1.25%	1.24%	1.62%
Total	8,525	7,103	6,618	5,252	4,147	100.00%	100.00%	100.00%	100.00%	100.00%

=== 2010 census ===
As of the 2010 United States census, there were 5,252 people living in the county. 56.5% were Black or African American, 41.9% White, 0.2% Asian, 0.1% Native American, 0.5% of some other race and 0.8% of two or more races. 1.2% were Hispanic or Latino (of any race).

=== 2000 census ===
As of the census of 2000, there were 6,618 people, 2,416 households, and 1,635 families living in the parish. The population density was 11 people per square mile (4.2 people/km^{2}). There were 3,359 housing units at an average density of 6 per square mile (2.3/km^{2}). The racial makeup of the parish was 55.6% Black or African American, 43.2% White, 0.1% Native American, 0.2% Asian, 0.29% from other races, and 0.9% from two or more races. 1.4% of the population were Hispanic or Latino of any race.

There were 2,416 households, out of which 30.00% had children under the age of 18 living with them, 43.10% were married couples living together, 20.20% had a female householder with no husband present, and 32.30% were non-families. 29.30% of all households were made up of individuals, and 14.90% had someone living alone who was 65 years of age or older. The average household size was 2.54 and the average family size was 3.14.

In the parish the population was spread out, with 26.50% under the age of 18, 10.00% from 18 to 24, 25.10% from 25 to 44, 22.90% from 45 to 64, and 15.50% who were 65 years of age or older. The median age was 37 years. For every 100 females there were 97.80 males. For every 100 females age 18 and over, there were 96.20 males.

The median income for a household in the parish was $19,799, and the median income for a family was $25,739. Males had a median income of $26,636 versus $16,781 for females. The per capita income for the parish was $12,622. About 30.00% of families and 36.30% of the population were below the poverty line, including 48.20% of those under age 18 and 29.60% of those age 65 or over.

== Education ==
Public schools in Tensas Parish are operated by the elected seven-member Tensas Parish School Board.

== Government ==
Parish Administration	Administrators
Sheriff	Robert L. "Rob" Rushing
Coroner	David McEacharn
Assessor	Donna R. Ratcliff
School Board Superintendent	Joyce M. Russ

Parish Police Jury	Police Jurors
District 1	Alex "Chip" Watson Jr.
District 2	Terrence South
District 3	Bill Crigler
District 4	Billy Arceneaux
District 5	Cash Clay Foster
District 6	Bubba Rushing (President)
District 7	Robert Clark (Vice President)

6th Judicial District	Parish Judicial Leaders
Judge of Division "A"	Angela L. Claxton
Judge of Division "B"	Laurie R. Brister (Chief Judge)
District Attorney	James E. Paxton
Clerk of Court	Christina "Christy" C. Lee

Parish School Board	Board Members
District 1	Jennifer Burnside
District 2	Knola Faye Ransome
District 3	George Matthews
District 4	Annice Miller
District 5	Esaw Turner (Vice President)
District 6	Joseph Tarver
District 7	John L. Turner (President)

The Tensas Parish Library was established in 1952.

== The Tensas Gazette ==
Tensas Parish is served by a weekly newspaper, The Tensas Gazette, which began in 1871 under the title The North Louisiana Journal. It was renamed The Tensas Gazette in 1886. Some 1,300 copies are circulated each Wednesday throughout the parish.

Josiah Scott (born 1874 in Vidalia) was reared by a maternal uncle who was the editor of the Concordia Sentinel. At the age of twenty, Scott took over The Tensas Gazette, then owned by Judge Hugh Tullis. In 1906, Scott purchased the paper from Tullis and continued as editor until his death in 1953. He was known for political commentary over the decades.

Upon Scott's death, Paul Alexander Myers Jr., and his wife, the former Patricia Wilds (1924–1999) purchased The Tensas Gazette and operated it together until his death in 1964. Thereafter until her retirement in 1988, Mrs. Myers owned and published the paper.

No longer under local ownership, The Tensas Gazette is now published by Louisiana State Newspapers, Inc. After years in a downtown location, The Tensas Gazette moved to 118 Arts Drive near the new Tensas Parish Civic Center off U.S. Highway 65.

== Notable people ==
- Henry Watkins Allen, Confederate States of America general and Civil War governor of Louisiana, grew cotton in Tensas Parish near Newellton in the years prior to the war before he relocated to Baton Rouge and became a public figure.
- Daniel F. Ashford (1879–1929), member of the Louisiana House of Representatives from 1916 until his death; planter, first person in Tensas Parish to own an automobile and a wristwatch.
- Andrew Brimmer, the first African American appointed (by President Lyndon B. Johnson) to the Federal Reserve Board in Washington, D.C., was born in Tensas Parish.
- Clifford Cleveland Brooks, cotton planter; member of the Louisiana State Senate from 1924 to 1932
- Sharon Renee Brown, Miss Louisiana USA 1961, Miss USA 1961, was Miss Waterproof that same year.
- Buddy Caldwell, district attorney from East Carroll, Madison, and Tensas parishes and thereafter attorney general of Louisiana, elected 2007.
- Claire Chennault of the "Flying Tigers," though born in Commerce, Texas, lived for a time in Waterproof in southern Tensas Parish.
- George Henry Clinton, chemist, lawyer, member of both houses of the legislature from Tensas Parish.
- Charles C. Cordill, Louisiana state senator from Tensas Parish from 1884 to 1912
- Brenham C. Crothers (1905–1984), Ferriday cattleman who represented Tensas Parish in the Louisiana State Senate from 1948 to 1952 and again from 1956 to 1960
- Joseph T. Curry (1895–1961), Louisiana state representative from Tensas Parish from 1930 to 1944
- James Houston "Jimmie" Davis, singer, songwriter and governor; owned farm property in Tensas Parish.
- Sarah Dorsey, author and benefactor of Jefferson Davis
- C. B. Forgotston (1945–2016), Hammond attorney, political activist, and state government watchdog
- Samuel W. Martien (1854–1946), planter from Waterproof and member of the Louisiana House of Representatives from 1906 to 1920
- James Albert Noe Sr., former governor of Louisiana; once owned farm property in Tensas Parish.
- Phil Preis, Baton Rouge attorney; gubernatorial candidate in 1995 and 1999
- Clyde V. Ratcliff, Louisiana state senator from 1944 to 1948 and planter in Newellton until his death in 1952
- J.C. Seaman, state representative from Tensas Parish from 1944 to 1964; promoter of Lake Bruin State Park
- Jefferson B. Snyder, district attorney for Tensas, Madison, and East Carroll parishes from 1904 to 1948
- Robert H. Snyder, state representative from Tensas Parish from 1890 to 1896 and 1904–1906, Speaker of the Louisiana House of Representatives in the second term, died in office; Lieutenant governor from 1896 to 1900
- Thomas M. Wade (1860–1929), member of Louisiana House of Representatives from 1888 to 1904, Louisiana State Board of Education, and Tensas Parish School Board; Tensas school superintendent for some twenty years after 1904

== Politics ==
United States presidential election results for Tensas Parish, Louisiana
Year	Republican		Democratic		Third party(ies)	
Year	No.	%	No.	%	No.	%
1912	1	0.42%	220	91.67%	19	7.92%
1916	5	2.37%	204	96.68%	2	0.95%
1920	15	5.81%	243	94.19%	0	0.00%
1924	21	5.85%	338	94.15%	0	0.00%
1928	96	21.52%	350	78.48%	0	0.00%
1932	29	4.36%	635	95.49%	1	0.15%
1936	23	2.75%	812	97.25%	0	0.00%
1940	95	9.03%	957	90.97%	0	0.00%
1944	160	20.05%	638	79.95%	0	0.00%
1948	72	6.89%	239	22.87%	734	70.24%
1952	703	50.54%	688	49.46%	0	0.00%
1956	359	34.99%	324	31.58%	343	33.43%
1960	510	42.22%	247	20.45%	451	37.33%
1964	1,655	89.60%	192	10.40%	0	0.00%
1968	503	19.07%	845	32.03%	1,290	48.90%
1972	1,729	50.47%	1,568	45.77%	129	3.77%
1976	1,553	42.24%	2,081	56.60%	43	1.17%
1980	1,645	43.46%	2,046	54.06%	94	2.48%
1984	1,956	53.52%	1,628	44.54%	71	1.94%
1988	1,645	50.00%	1,556	47.29%	89	2.71%
1992	1,153	35.30%	1,666	51.01%	447	13.69%
1996	1,000	32.27%	1,882	60.73%	217	7.00%
2000	1,330	44.19%	1,580	52.49%	100	3.32%
2004	1,453	49.04%	1,469	49.58%	41	1.38%
2008	1,367	44.97%	1,646	54.14%	27	0.89%
2012	1,230	43.74%	1,564	55.62%	18	0.64%
2016	1,182	46.39%	1,332	52.28%	34	1.33%
2020	1,197	46.87%	1,329	52.04%	28	1.10%
2024	1,093	51.36%	1,002	47.09%	33	1.55%

== See also ==
- National Register of Historic Places listings in Tensas Parish, Louisiana

== Gallery ==
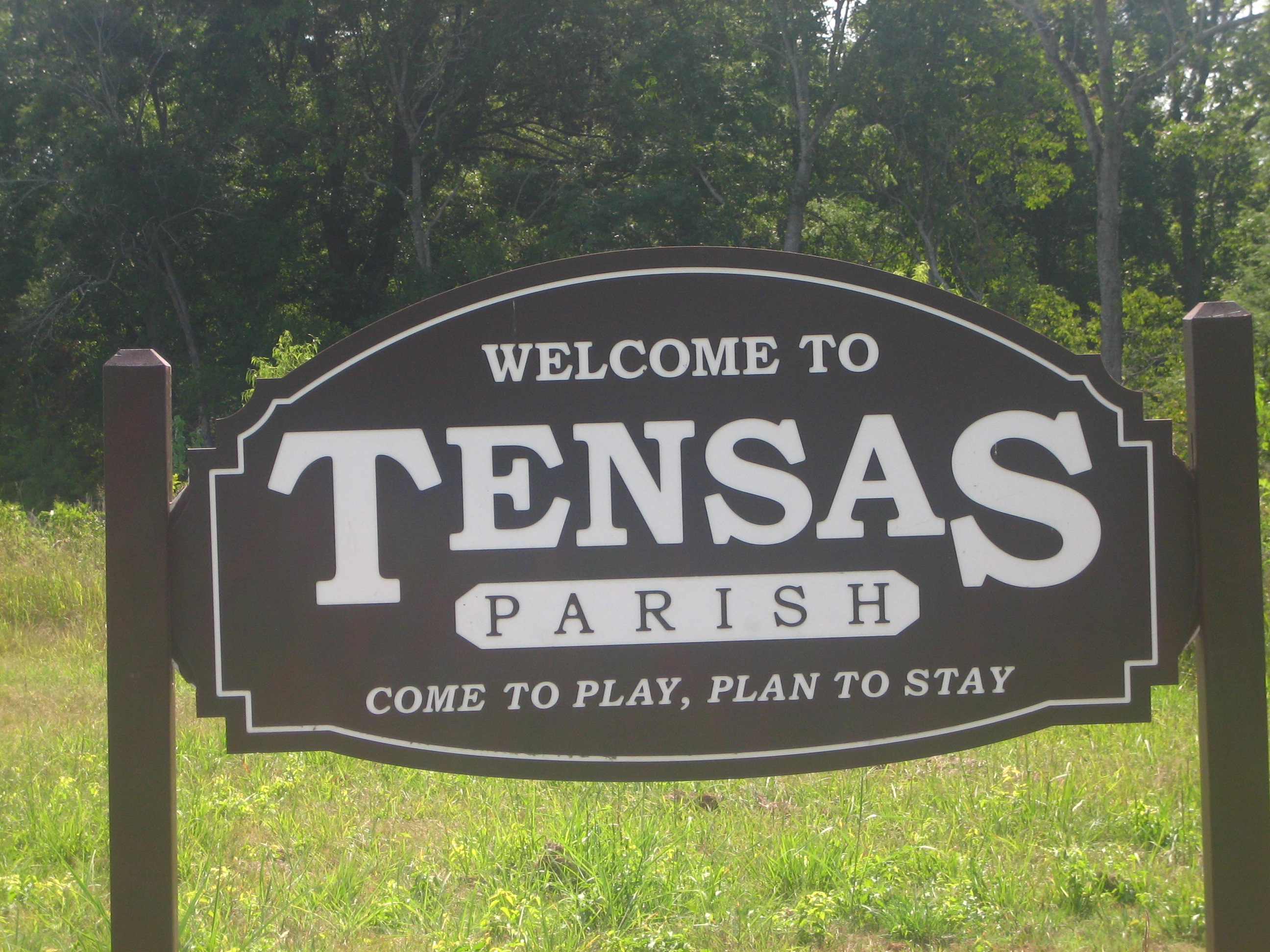
Tensas Parish welcoming sign on United States Highway 65

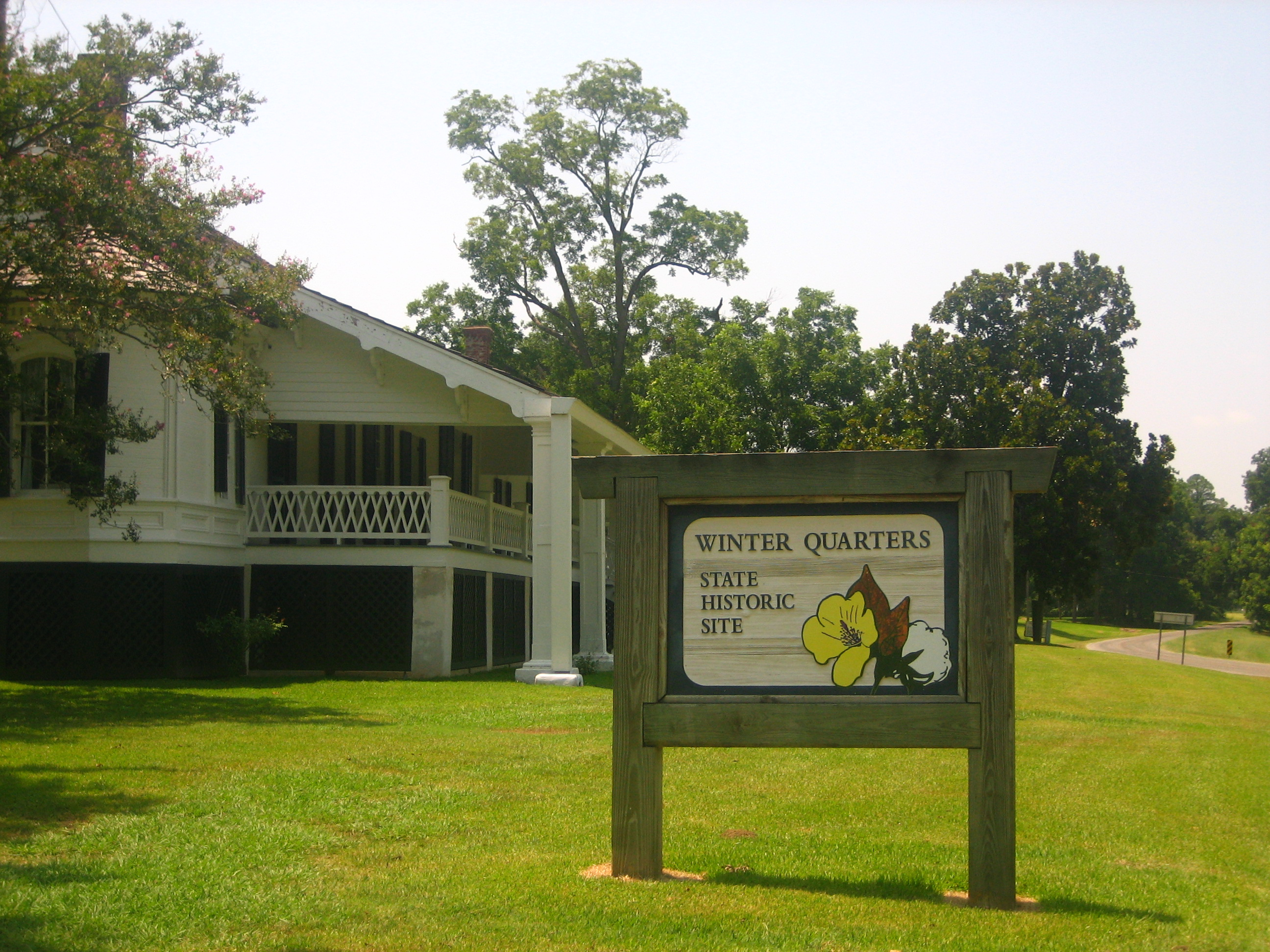
Winter Quarters State Historic Site near Newellton

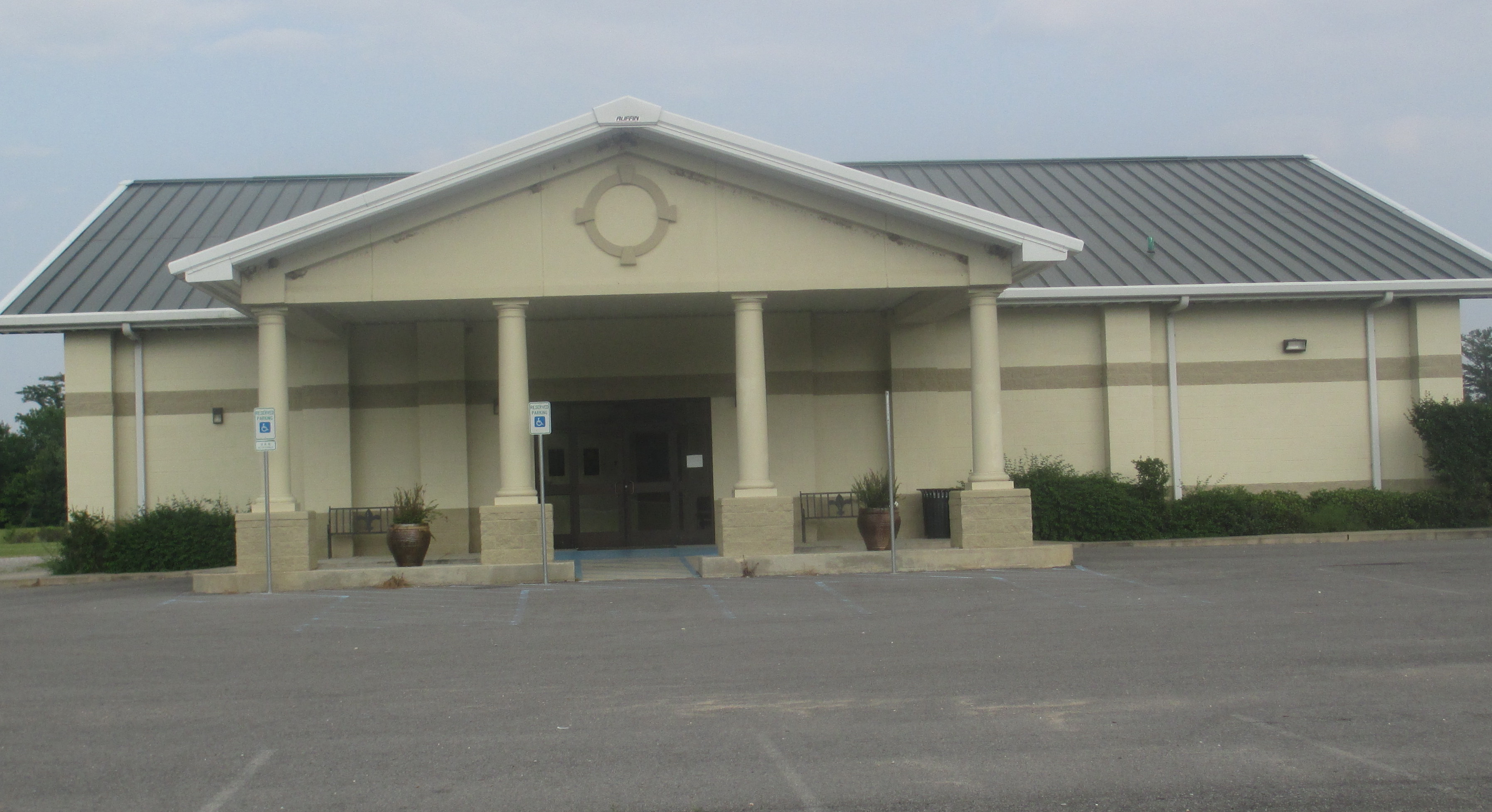
The Tensas Parish Civic Center is located at 115 Arts Drive off U.S. Highway 65 in St. Joseph.

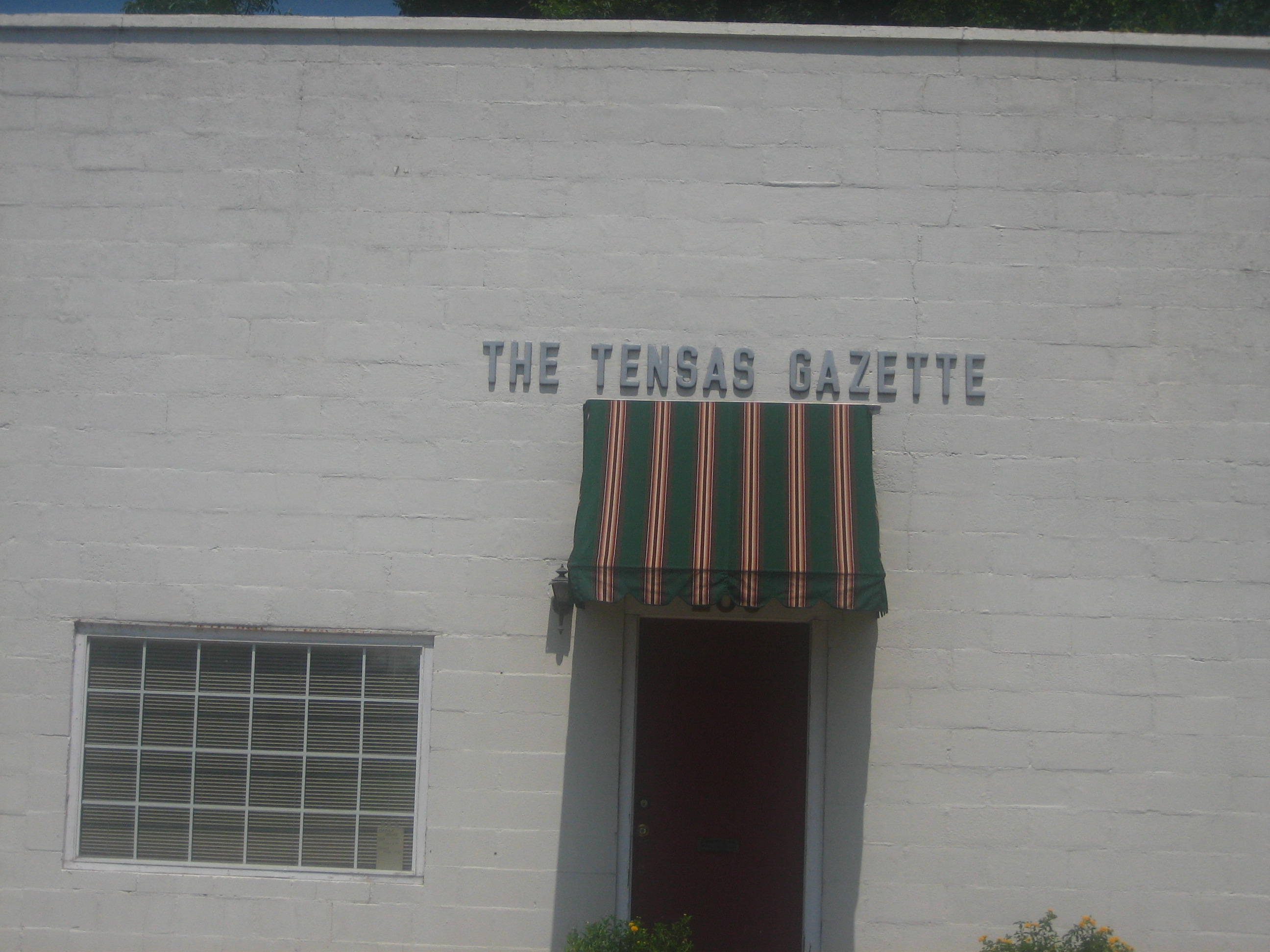
Former location downtown in St. Joseph of the weekly newspaper, The Tensas Gazette (established 1886).

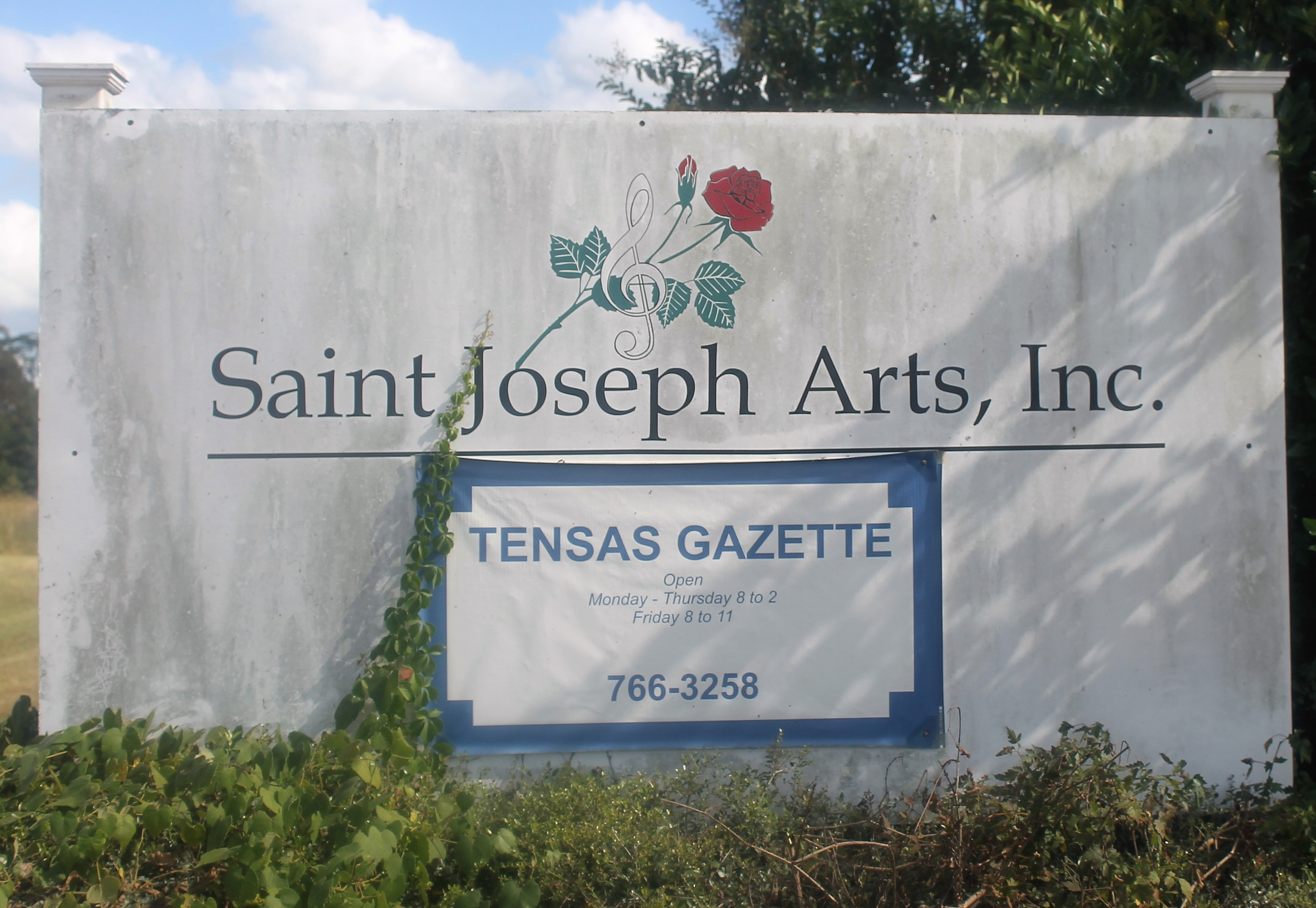
The Tensas Gazette currently shares space with the arts council at 118 Arts Drive.

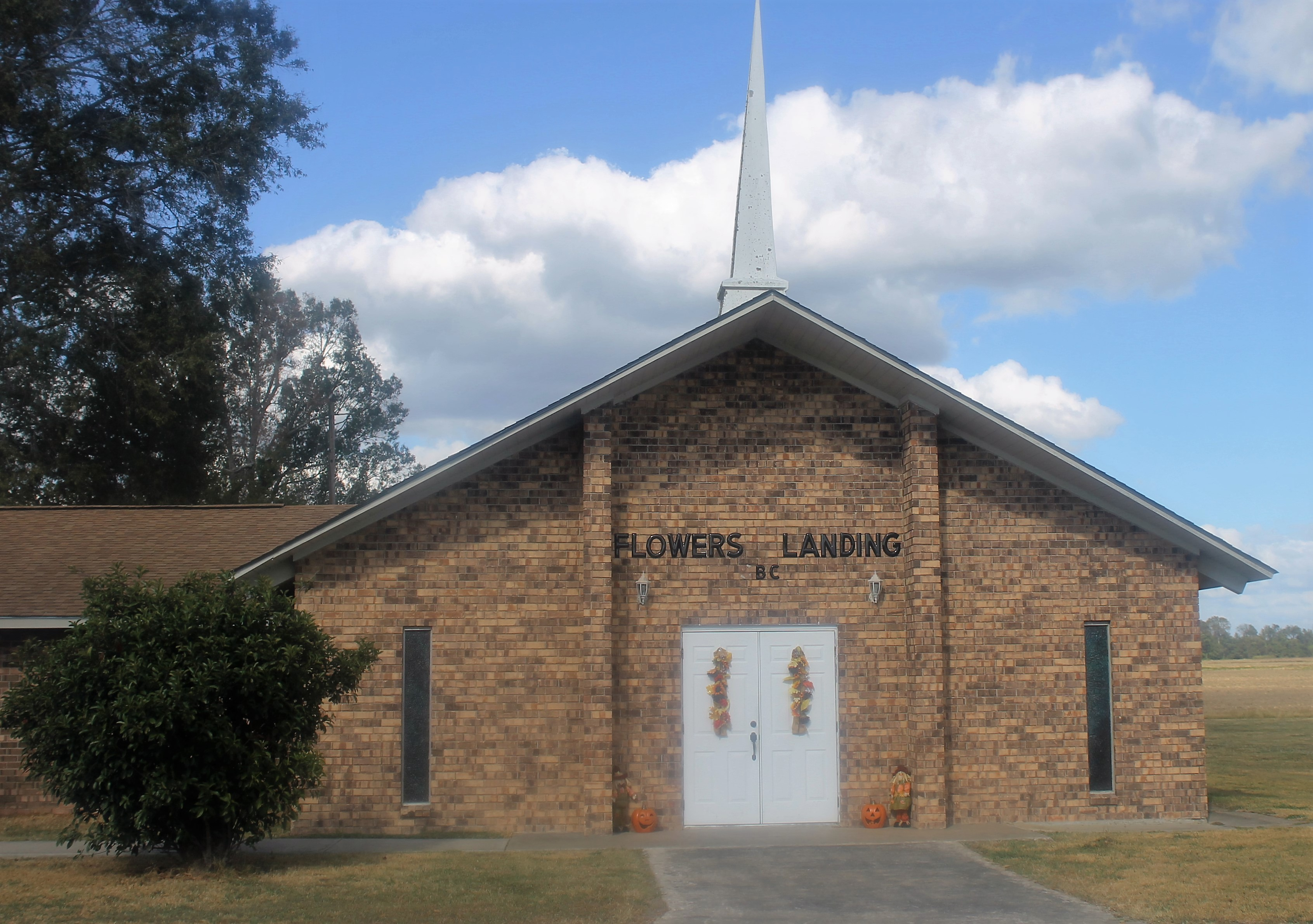
Flowers Landing Baptist Church, a Southern Baptist congregation at 2302 Louisiana Highway 888 northwest of Newellton, serves a rural clientele.

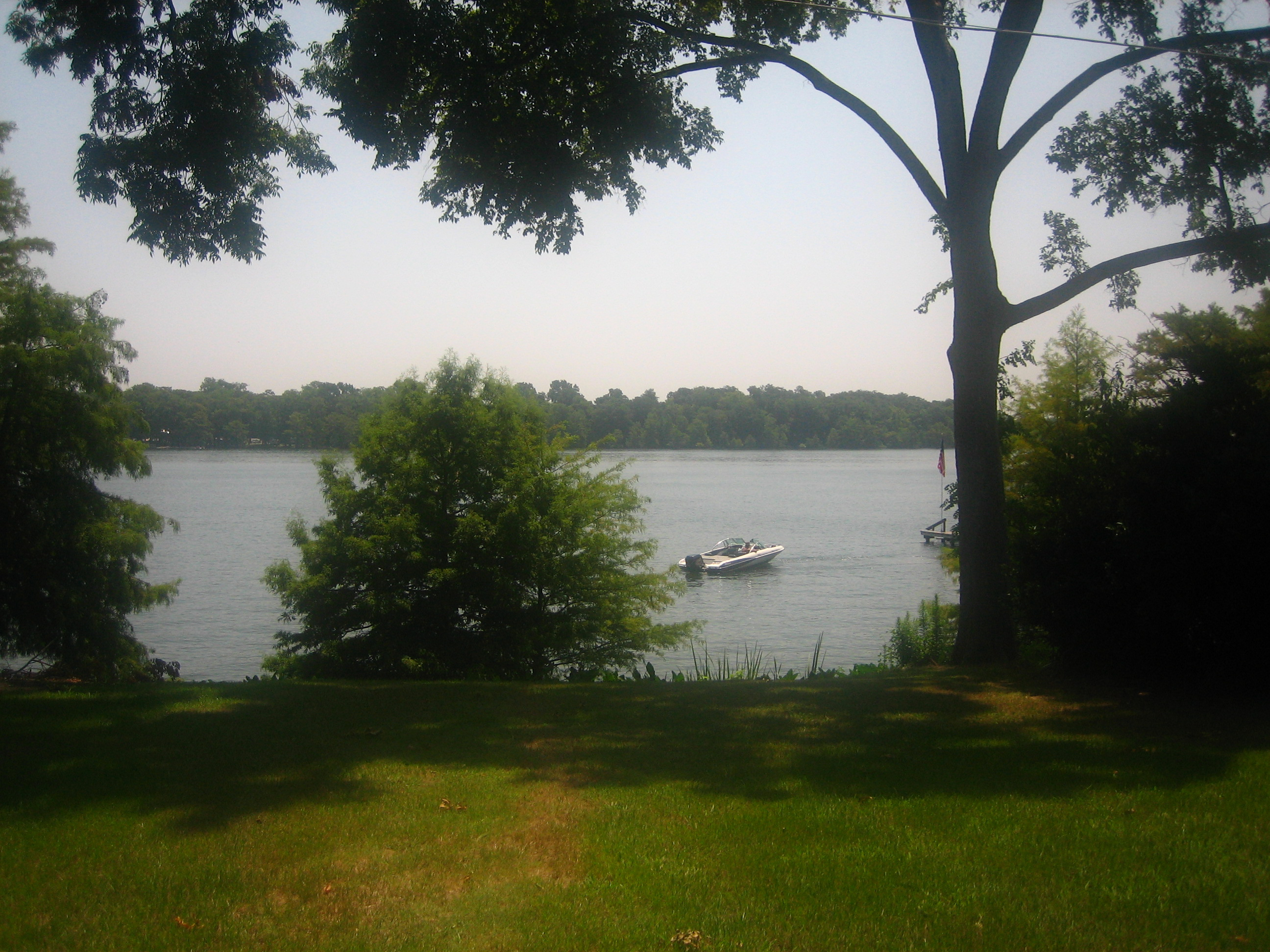
Boating on popular Lake Bruin in Tensas Parish near St. Joseph

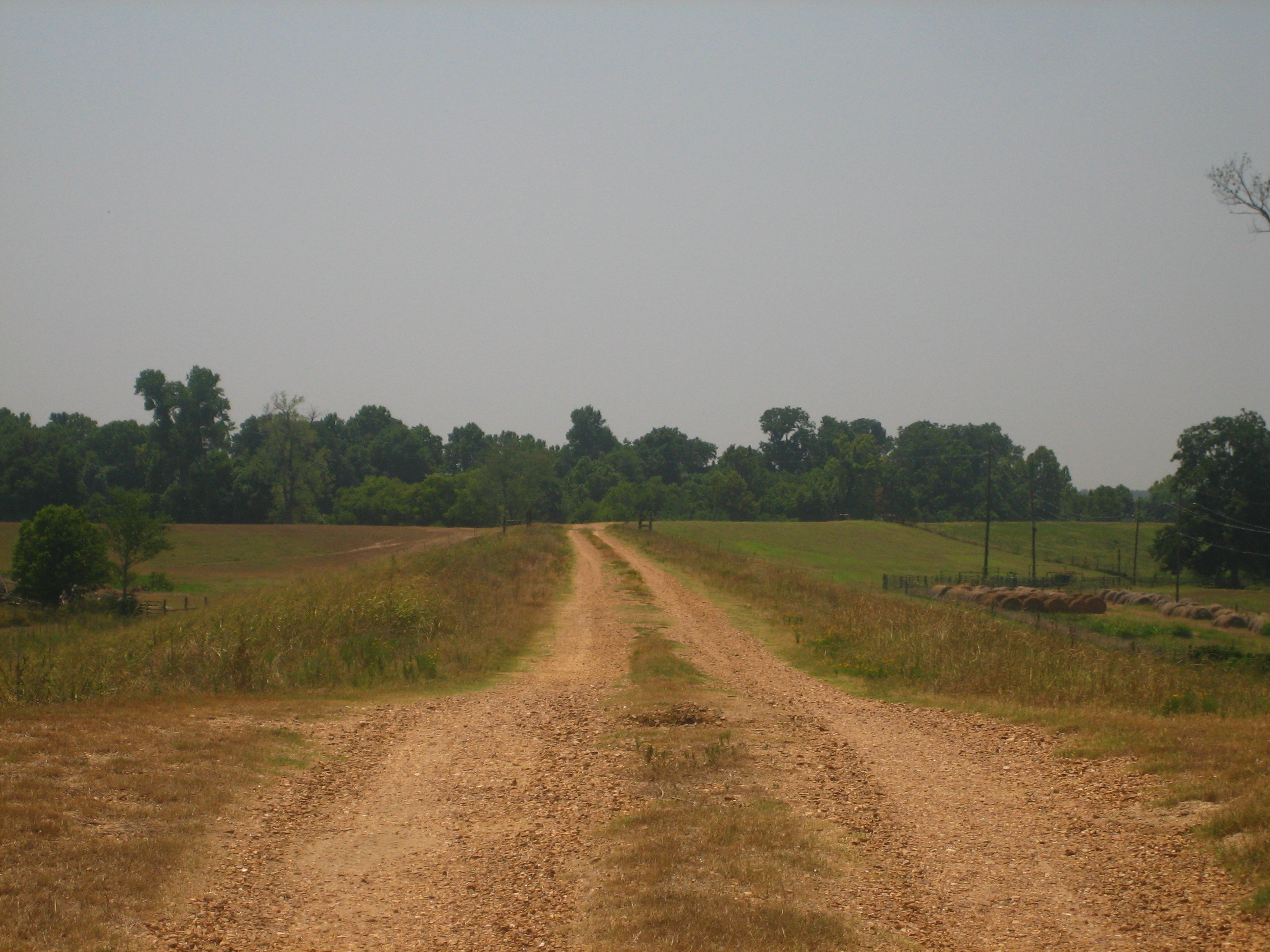
Mississippi River levee road in Tensas Parish near St. Joseph

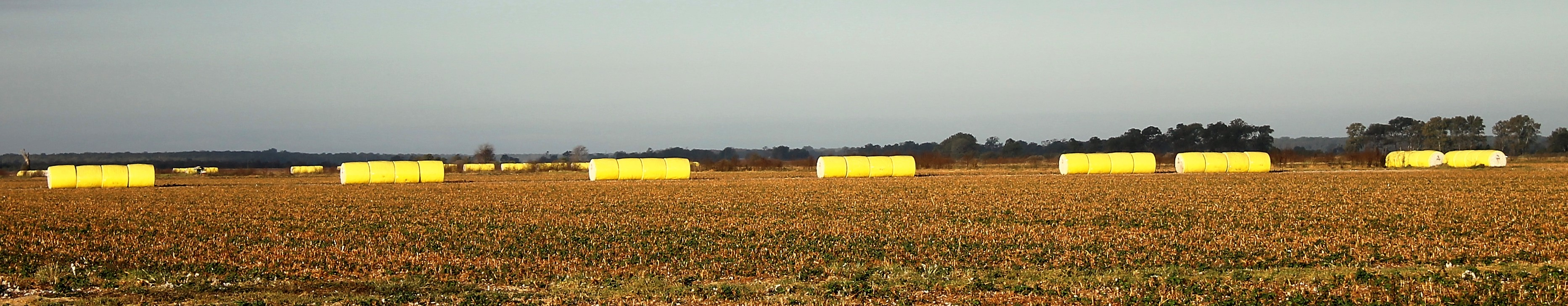
The hay harvest south of Newellton (2016)
