= Andrew L. Sevier =

American politician (1894 – 1962)

Andrew Leonard Sevier Sr. (November 9, 1894 – March 26, 1962), was an American attorney from Tallulah, Louisiana, who served for thirty years from 1932 until his death as a Democratic member of the Louisiana State Senate. He represented the 32nd District, which then included Madison, East Carroll, Tensas, and Concordia parishes.

A descendant of John Sevier -- a fighter in the American Revolution, former governor of Tennessee, and the namesake of Sevierville and Sevier County near Knoxville -- he was a World War I veteran. A founder member of a Tallulah law firm, Spencer Sevier & Adams, at the time of his death, he was serving as president of the Federal Land Bank, of which he had been a member since 1933.

== Personal life ==
One of six children born to George Sevier and Florence Arrenah (née Leonard) Sevier, he married Irene Jordan in 1918, with whom he had three sons.
